= Battle of Ostróda =

Battle in 1628 part of the Polish-Swedish War (1626-1629)

- Part of Polish-Swedish War (1626–1629)
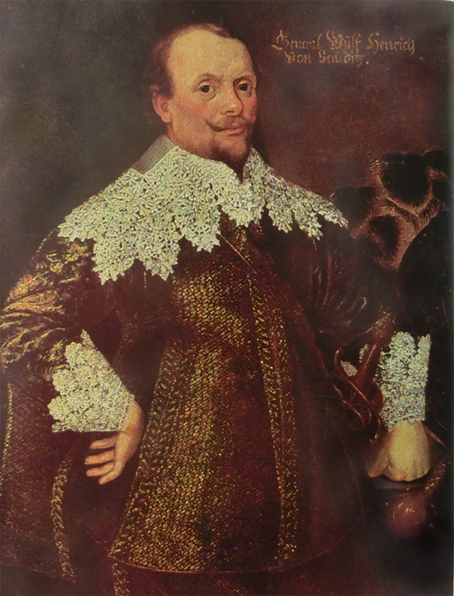
- Wolf Heinrich von Baudissin
Date	23 October 1628
Location	Ostróda, modern-day Poland
Result	Polish–Lithuanian victory

Belligerents
Polish–Lithuanian Commonwealth	Swedish Empire

Commanders and leaders
(Polish–Lithuanian Commonwealth) Stanisław Koniecpolski (Polish–Lithuanian Commonwealth) Jakub Butler	(Swedish Empire) Wolf Heinrich von Baudissin (POW)

Strength
2,700 cavalry 800 infantry	1,000 cavalry

Casualties and losses
Unknown	250–350 killed 50 captured

The Battle of Ostróda was a battle that took place on the 23rd of October 1628 in Ostróda during the Polish–Swedish War (1626–1629) between the Polish–Lithuanian Commonwealth commanded by Hetman Stanisław Koniecpolski and Jakub Butler against the Swedish Empire commanded by colonel Wolf Heinrich von Baudissin. It resulted in a Polish victory.

== Prelude ==
After the loss of Brodnica, Hetman Koniecpolski started the Polish-Swedish War against the Swedish Empire. During the march from Osa, the Swedes lost over 5,000 people. As one of the Swedish officers wrote: "Our Swedes are leaving the ranks every day, and the foreigners are so discouraged that a revolt is expected any day now... There is misery in the country. There is such a shortage of good accommodation that only four houses can be found on the shelf. The roads are so terrible that you can barely cover half a mile a day with guns. The enemy is cutting from the rear and cutting off all supplies."

== Timeline of the battle ==
Koniecpolski, thanks to intercepting enemy correspondence, learned about the march from Pasłęk of a cavalry regiment under the command of Colonel Baudissin. He decided to set up an ambush on the road connecting Miłomłyn and Ostróda. Polish forces numbered approximately 3,500 soldiers. They included a regiment of dragoons under the command of Jakub Butler, a few light cavalry banners and hussar banners.

The regiment numbered several hundred people, mainly German mercenaries, who, together with their commander, left the Danish army and joined the Swedish army. These regiments became some of the finest German cavalry regiments in Swedish service between 1626 and 1634. It is known that at the beginning of the campaign it had 1,500 horsemen, grouped in 12 companies, but during the fighting it suffered heavy losses and in October it numbered just over a thousand soldiers. The regiment reached the Swedish camp located in Miłomłyn, from where it was sent by the Swedish king to Ostróda in order to obtain provisions and secure heavy guns left there by the Swedes.

There was a clash between Piławki and Faltyjanki, likely near the water mill, which is found in a ravine near the road. The mill was burned down during the battles. The Swedes encountered Polish cavalry crossing the ford. Baudissin, unaware of the Polish advantage, decided to attack them. The reiters chased down after the Polish troops retreating towards the ravine, but during the charge they came under fire from Colonel Butler's troops hidden in the forest. Baudissin, leading the charge, was wounded, while his regiment was dependent on several Polish (hussar) banners, previously hidden behind trees. Thanks to the approaching darkness, most of the reiters managed to break out of the encirclement. During the fight, the German mercenaries suffered heavy losses.

== Losses ==
250 soldiers died, other sources saying that the entire regiment of 350 soldiers were killed (although they should be treated with caution) and the colonel himself along with 50 soldiers were taken prisoner. As Hetman Koniecpolski wrote with joy, "Baudis [in this case Baudissin] (...) fell into our hands with many of his considerable soldiers, and his regiment, which cost Gustav's strength and made many promises from him, is abolished." The Swedes admitted to the loss of three Cornets (however the hetman does not mention this in the letter), and when Baudissin was exchanged for Polish prisoners and returned to the Swedish army, he was reprimanded for using 'German tactics' (i.e. caracole) in the face of Polish cavalry.

== Aftermath ==
Koniecpolski decided to retreat, considering the position near Ostróda too inconvenient to defend. The captured commander provided the hetman with information about the financing of Swedish troops by the Dutch. The clash had no major strategic importance. Baudissin's regiment, despite suffering heavy losses, was not completely destroyed. He later participated in the Battle of Górzno and the Battle of Trzciana. During the Thirty Years' War, he was promoted to the rank of general of cavalry in the Swedish army. He then served in the Saxon army. The day after the battle, Ostróda was occupied by Swedish troops numbering 4,000 soldiers under the command of King Gustavus Adolphus.
