= Iława =

Town in Warmian-Masurian Voivodeship, Poland

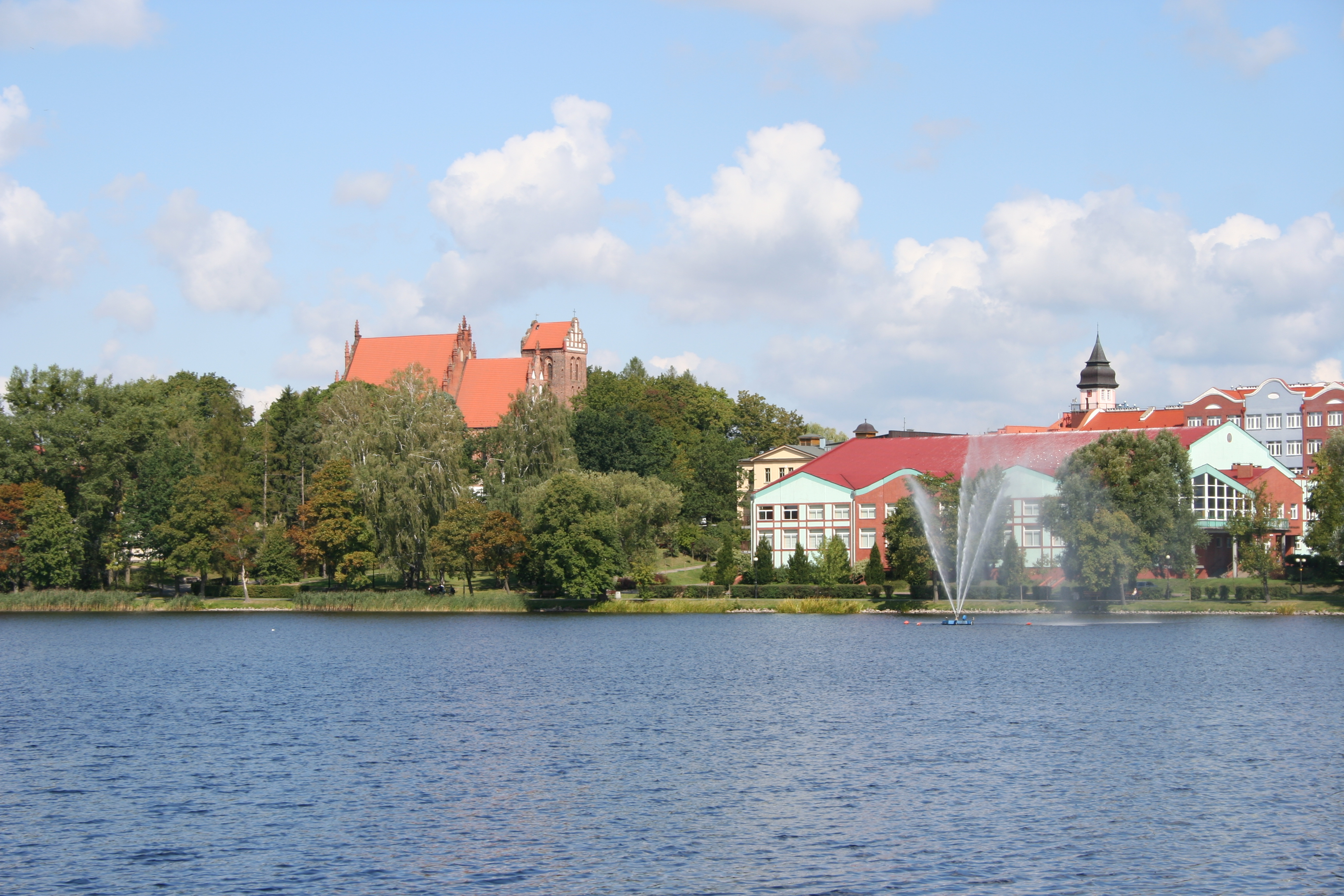
- View of Iława from Mały Jeziorak Lake with the Church of the Transfiguration on the left

- Flag Coat of arms

- Location within Poland
- Coordinates: 53°35′47″N 19°33′56″E
- Country: Poland
- Voivodeship: Warmian–Masurian
- County: Iława
- Gmina: Iława (urban gmina)
- Established: 1305
- Town rights: 1305

Government
  - Mayor: Dawid Kopaczewski

Area
  - Total: 21.88 km^{2} (8.45 sq mi)
- Highest elevation: 150 m (490 ft)
- Lowest elevation: 100 m (330 ft)

Population (2025)
  - Total: 32,013
  - Density: 1,463/km^{2} (3,789/sq mi)
- Time zone: UTC+1 (CET)
  - Summer (DST): UTC+2 (CEST)
- Postal code: 14-200 to 14-210
- Area code: +48 89
- Car plates: NIL
- Website: http://www.ilawa.pl

Iława (Polish: [iˈwava]; German: Deutsch Eylau [dɔʏtʃ ˈʔaɪlaʊ]) is a town in northern Poland with 32,013 inhabitants (2025). It is the capital of Iława County in the Warmian–Masurian Voivodeship.

The town is located in the Iławskie Lake District, on the longest lake in Poland – Jeziorak. It is located in the area of historical Pomesania. The rivers Iławka and Tynwałd flow through Iława. Within the town's administrative area there is the largest inland island in Poland – Wielka Żuława, which has a permanent ferry connection with the town. The town is located in the area of the Green Lungs of Poland - an area characterized by clean air and diversity of the natural system. From the west and north, Iława is surrounded by the Iława Lake District Landscape Park. Iława is a holiday, paralympic and tourist resort. In the forest just outside Iława there are two Polish Television holiday resorts (Sarnówek and Tłokowisko) to which journalists come for a holiday. From Iława, the Baltic Sea can be accessed through Jeziorak Lake and the historic, unique in the world Elbląg Canal.

At Lake Silm, one of the world's several training centres for skippers and port pilots, they learn to manoeuvre seagoing ships on miniaturised models. The town is called the summer capital of traditional jazz because of the oldest festival of this music genre in Europe - Old Jazz Meeting "Złota Tarka". In Iława there is the Pope's Calvary of the Iława Lake District, whose canoe-shaped Stations of the Cross refer to and commemorate Karol Wojtyła's two visits to Jeziorak, after which the future Pope was kayaking with young people. Iława lies on the Road of St. James (one of the most important Christian pilgrimage routes in the world) which leads to the Cathedral of Santiago de Compostela in Spain.

== Natural conditions ==
As of January 1, 2009, the area of the city is 21.88 km (14 mi)², placing the city on the third position in the province. The town is also the fifth largest in the Warmia and Mazury region and the fifth in the population.

Iława and its surroundings lie on undulating moraine and sandstone areas, distinguished by varied forms of sculpture. Within the city, on Lake Jeziorak (the longest lake in Poland and the sixth largest) is the island of Wielka Żuława with relics of an Old Prussian town. In the vicinity of the city, in the sand terrain, there are lakes, mainly gutter lakes, surrounded by significant forest complexes. In Iława itself, apart from the mentioned Jeziorak, there are a dozen or so smaller lakes (i.e. Little Jeziorak, Iławskie, Dół). The lakes and rivers of the Iławskie Lake land form, together with the Elbląg Canal, a wide system of inland navigation, connecting the surrounding water bodies. This channel makes it possible to reach the Baltic Sea from Iława.

== History ==
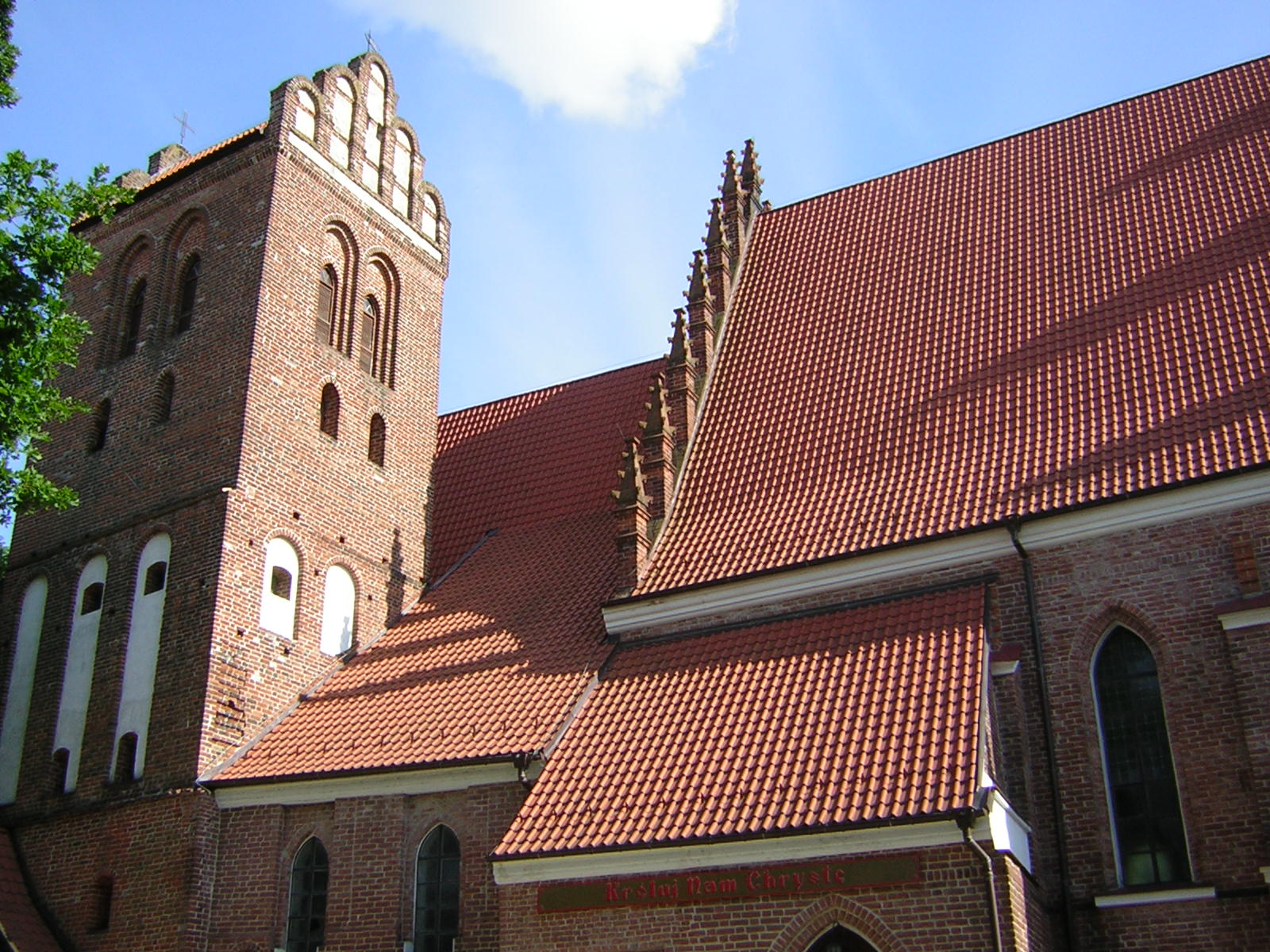
Gothic Church of the Transfiguration

The city existed originally as an Old Prussian settlement and was recorded by Teutonic Knights in Prussia in 1305. It is documented in a manuscript by Luther von Braunschweig in 1317 and its first names are known as Ylavia, Ylaw, and Ilow. It was located on the Iławka River between Lakes Jeziorak and Iławskie. The town was under the jurisdiction of the komtur of Christburg (Dzierzgoń) and since 1340 under Osterode (Ostróda).

At the start of the Thirteen Years' War (1454–1466) in February 1454, Iława sided with the Prussian Confederation, at the request of which King Casimir IV Jagiellon signed the act of incorporation of the region to Poland. In April 1454 the town pledged allegiance to the Polish King. After Poland's loss at the Battle of Chojnice, in November 1454 it was taken over by the Teutonic Knights, who handed over its defence to Czech mercenaries. In 1457, the unpaid Czech mercenaries sold the town to Poland. After the peace treaty signed in Toruń in 1466 the town was a part of Poland as a fief. In 1520 Polish King Sigismund I the Old granted Iława the right to collect tolls on the bridge over Jeziorak.

In 1525 the town became part of the Duchy of Prussia, a vassal state of the Polish Crown, and in 1701 it became part of the Kingdom of Prussia. Administered within the new province of West Prussia in 1773, it became part of the German Empire in 1871. During the Seven Years' War, the town was occupied by Russia between 1758 and 1762. In October–December 1831, several Polish infantry units of the November Uprising stopped in the town on the way to their internment places.

In 1862 the Elbląg Canal was built between Elbing (Elbląg) and Eylau by engineer Georg Steenke, which enabled the inland town to transport bulk of lumber, farm products, and other goods north to Elbing and the Baltic Sea. This was superseded ten years later by rail transport, when the Thorn (Toruń)-Insterburg (Chernyakhovsk) railway line was constructed.

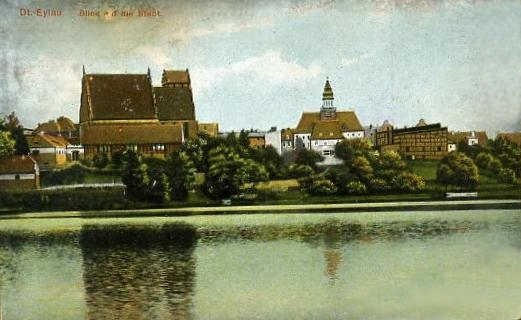
Town view from the Jeziorak Lake in the early 20th century

According to the German census of 1910, the town had a population of 10,087, of which 9,566 (94.8%) were Germans and 380 (3.8%) were Poles. After Poland regained its independence in 1918, the East Prussian plebiscite of 1920 allowed the residents to cast votes either in favor of remaining in Germany or becoming a part of Poland. The vote took place amid persecution of Polish activists by the German side. Ultimately the town voted to remain in Germany by 4,746 to 235 votes. It became part of Regierungsbezirk West Prussia in the Province of East Prussia.

During World War II, the German Nazi government operated a penal subcamp of the prison in Sztum. Its prisoners were mostly Poles, and many either died of hunger or cold, or were executed. There was also a forced labour camp for some 1,200 people, and Poles were also enslaved as forced labour in the town's vicinity. The Polish resistance movement was active and one of the region's main smuggling points for underground Polish press was located in the area. Towards the end of the war, most population left the town, and the Soviet Army destroyed approximately 85% of the town. After World War II, the town became again part of Poland in accordance with the Potsdam Agreement, and the historic Polish name Iława was adopted.

== Toponyms ==
The name Iława is thought to originate from the ancient Prussian word ilis, meaning black. The related Baltic-Slavic word ilo or ilu means the black colour but also mud. The name might refer to the swampy area where the city lies, or to the dark water of the lake Jeziorak.

The oldest written form of the name Iława is Latin Ylavia. This form appeared on a location document from 1317. Later documents of 1333 and 1334 mention Ylav, while the variety Ylau is mentioned in 1338. In the fifteenth century, the form Ylow and Ylow Thethonicalis appeared. In the years 1430 and 1438, the documents issued by the Dzierzgon command post spoke of Deutschen Ylaw. In the years 1443, 1457 and 1458 the town was named Ylau, and in 1456 it took the form of Ilau, then in 1459 it was changed to Eylaw. The name Deutze Eylau is used in 1457 and its other form Dwetsch Eylau in 1468. Between the 16th and 17th centuries, the names Teutschen Eylau, Deutscheneylau and Theuto Ilavia appear. In the 18th century, the Deutsch Eylau form was adopted, valid until 1933. On 1 January 1934 the name was changed to Stadt Deutsch Eylau (Stadt - en. The town), and since 1945 the Polish name of the town is Iława, which was officially approved on 7 May 1946.

== Symbols of the town ==
On the coat of arms of Iława there is the figure of the Mother of God with the Child in her arms, who sits on the throne at the city gate. The coat of arms of Iława was amended by the resolution of the City Council of May 28, 1998.

Notes of the bugle-call

Iława's city bugle-call was approved by the resolution of the City Council of August 29, 1996. It is played every day at 12.00 on the trumpet from the town hall tower. It was composed in 1995 by Henryk Majewski - a well-known jazz musician, one of the organizers of the Złota Tarka festival held annually in Iława.

The flag of Iława was approved by a resolution of the City Council of April 24, 1997. It depicts the coat of arms of Iława and ten alternately arranged wavy stripes in white and blue, which symbolize waves of Jeziorak lake.

== Neighbourhoods in Iława ==
- Stare Miasto
- Centrum
- Ostródzkie
- Piastowskie
- Młodych
- Kormoran
- Lipowy Dwór
- Gajerek
- Podleśne
- XXX-lecia
- Dzielnica Przemysłowa
- Lubawskie
- Kopernika
- Nowy Świat
- Słoneczne
- Marina Iława
- Wojska Polskiego
- Sobieskiego

== Demography ==
Data as of 31 December 2024:

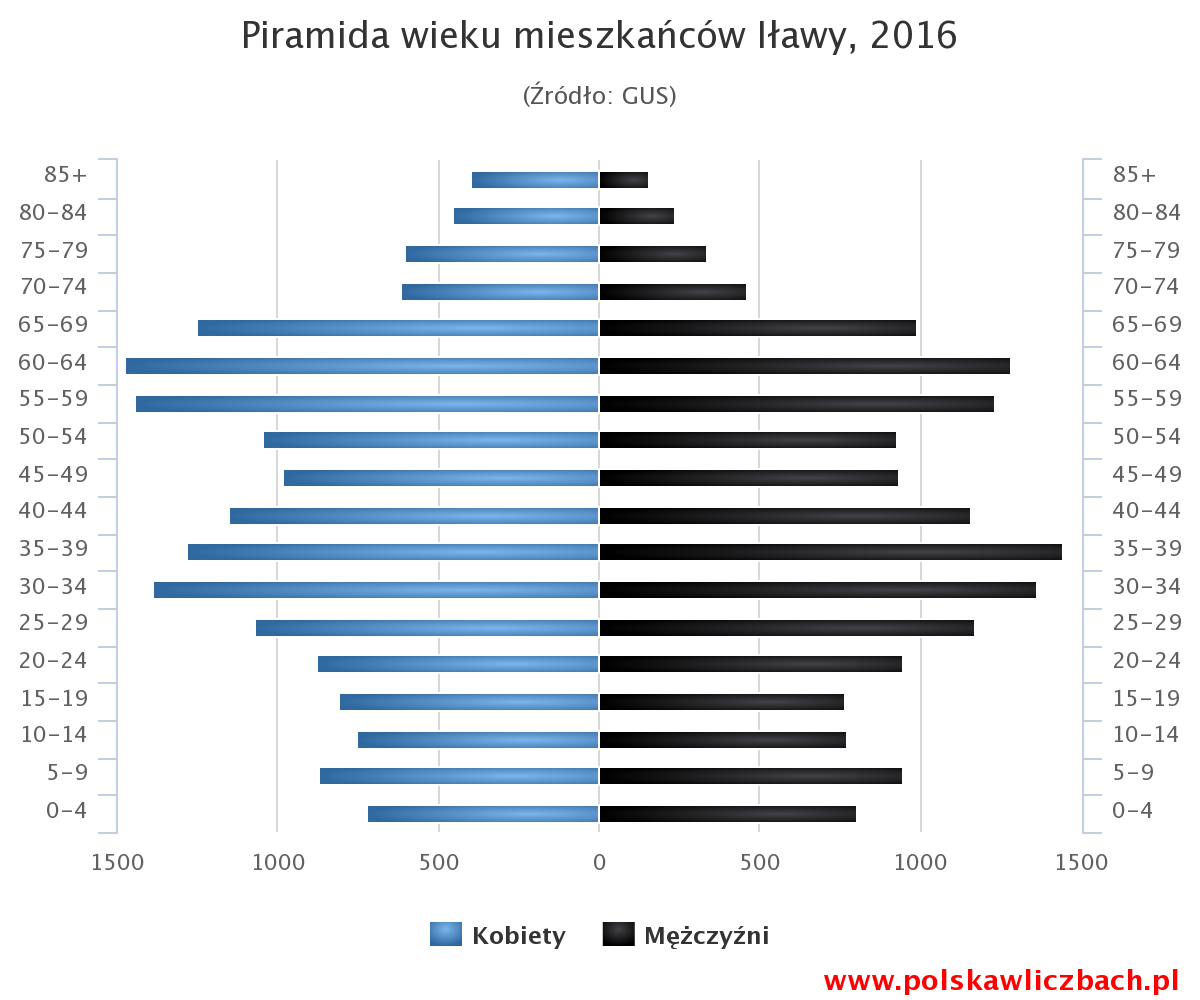
Age pyramid of Iława inhabitants

Description	In total		Woman		Man	
Unit	people	%	people	%	people	%
Population	32,013	100	16,760	52.4	15,253	47.6
Population density [inhabitant/km²]	1,463.1		766		697	

== Transport ==
Iława lies on national road 16 which connects it to Ostróda to the east and to Grudziądz to the west.

Iława is a major railway junction where the Gdańsk-Warsaw and Toruń-Olsztyn railway lines intersect. Iława Główna railway station serves direct Intercity trains to Gdańsk and Warsaw as well as direct Intercity trains to Toruń and Olsztyn.

== Economy and industry ==
In Iława County there is the second lowest unemployment rate in Warmińsko-Mazurskie Voivodeship (5.8%) just after Olsztyn County (5.1%) - data as of the end of August 2016. Iława is a subzone of the Warmia and Mazury Special Economic Zone.

== Culture ==
=== Cultural life ===
The town holiday is June 11, commemorating the location of Ilawa in 1305. Most of the cultural events in the city are under the patronage of the Iława Culture Centre. At the ICK there is the "Pasja"; cinema, where DKF "Kadr"; operates. There is the Municipal Public Library in Iława, as well as the District Pedagogical Library, which is a part of the District Centre for Education Development in Iława, and a branch of the Warmia and Mazury Pedagogical Library of Iława. The Karol Wojtyła Foundation in Elbląg. There are several art galleries in the city.

=== Festivals ===
- Open Air MayDay Lead Festival
- International Traditional Jazz Festival "Złota Tarka"; (oldest traditional jazz festival in Europe)
- Summer Theatrical Impressions
- Jeziorak Szanty
- International Festival of Classical Music "Viva Musica"
- Fama Rock Festival
- Hip-hop and rap music festival - Park Jam
- Soundlake Festival

=== Museums ===
- Sailing Memorial Chamber
- Museum of Automation and Military Affairs
- Museum of Graphic Arts "Mon petit Louvre";

=== Local media ===
==== Local press ====
- Kurier Iławski (weekly)
- Gazeta Iławska, weekly supplement to Gazeta Olsztyńska (weekly)
- Life of the Region (weekly)
- Panorama of the Region (monthly)
- Iławski Poviat - Regional monthly magazine
- Charming - a newspaper for children and young people published by the Iława Lakeland and Dylewskie Hills Landscape Parks Complex, published three times a year

==== Television ====
- Iława internet television ilawatv.pl

==== Radio ====
- Radio Eska Iława
- Meloradio

==== Local websites ====
- ilawa.pl
- ilawa.wm.pl
- powiatilawski.pl
- ilawa.naszemiasto.pl
- infoilawa.pl
- ilawa.dlawas.info

=== Iława in culture ===
In 1974, the film Gniazdo directed by Jan Rybkowski was recorded on Wielka Żuława Island, telling the story of the first years of the Polish state. The action of two adventures of "Pan Samochodzik"; - Nowe przygody Pana Samochodzika and Pan Samochodzik i złota rękawica by Zbigniew Nienacki - took place in Iława and at Jeziorak. In November 1995. Volker Schlöndorff (author of, "Blaszany bębenek";) shot scenes for his film King Olch with John Malkovich in the ruins of Szymbark Castle (8 km (5 mi) from Iława). In 1989, TVP recorded a documentary film Bloody Ilawa about the Ilawa prison famous for its rebellion, pacification and self-mutilation, as well as for the beating of the interned in spring 1982.

=== Jewish cemetery ===
The Jewish cemetery in Iława was established shortly after 1812 and covered an area of 0.44 hectare. It was devastated by the Nazis and then liquidated by the communist authorities between 1975 and 1976. The land and the remains of the people buried there were used to renovate the IKS Jeziorak stadium. Currently in its place there is an IKS Jeziorak training pitch.

== Sports ==
Iława is a centre of water sports. The city has many marinas, water equipment and bicycle rentals. The town has a sports stadium, a sports and entertainment hall, a sports swimming pool (Sports and Recreation Centre), a bowling alley, a Pump track extreme cycling track, a skatepark, an indoor ice rink, a traffic town, 2 guarded beaches, 3 Orlik pitches, a motocross-bike and bicycle track, a forest shootingrange, a rowing track, a mini-golf course, and several gyms. On November 18, 1992 at the Municipal Stadium in Iława a friendly football match between Poland and Latvia took place.

The Iława Sports Centre for Tourism and Recreation operates in Iława, which supports various sports sections. In the city there is a sports club Jeziorak Iława, consisting of several sections, among others football, handball, table tennis and taekwondo. Moreover, there are local clubs, institutions andassociations in Iława which bring together people who practice, amongothers martial arts, rowing, volleyball, tennis, athletics, swimming, shooting and cycling.

There is a troop of the Polish Scouting Association in Iława. There are two multi-level teams, three teams of hikers (16–21 years old), oneteam of older scouts (13–16 years old), four teams of scouts (13–19 years old) and four teams of chefs.

== Touristic trails ==
=== Walk trails ===
- Yellow Trail (28.3 km (18 mi)): from Iława to Samborow along Lake Jeziorak
- Blue Trail (26 km (16 mi)): from Iława through Sarnówek to Siemiany along Jeziorak Lake
- Green Trail (41.3 km (26 mi)): from Iława to Kamieniec
- The Forest Teaching Trail "Jasne";
- "Silm"; Forest Teaching Trail

=== Bike trails ===
- Trail red (about 60 km (37 mi)): from Iława north east to Jezierzyce and west to Kisielice
- Trail blue (about 60 km (37 mi)): from Iława to Zalewo along Gil Mały, Gil Wielki and Jeziorak lakes
- Trail green (about 137 km (85 mi)): from Iława to Elbląg along the Elbląg Canal
- Yellow trail (about 131 km (81 mi)): from Gorzno to Elbląg along the Elbląg Canal

=== Kayak trails ===
- The Sir Charles Canoeing Trail. John Paul II - Ostróda - Miłomłyn - Siemiany - Gizerek - IŁAWA
- The Old Apple Canoeing Trail - Miłomłyn - IŁAWA (length 63.4 km (39 mi)) - Stare Jabłonki - J. Szeląg M. - J. Szeląg W. - J. Pauzeńskie - Ostróda - J. Drwęckie - K. Elbląski - Miłomłyn - K. Iławski - J.Jeziorak - Chmielówka - Makowo - Szałkowo - IŁAWA
- Kayak Trail IŁAWA - Stare Jabłonki (length: 1.5 km (1 mi)) (73.3 km (46 mi)) -IŁAWA - Iławka - Drwęca - J. Drwęckie - Ostróda - J. Pauzeńskie - J.Szeląg W. i M. - S. Jabłonki
- Canoe trail IŁAWA - IŁAWA (length 136.7 km (85 mi)) - Reich. Iławka - Rz. Drwęca - J. Drwęckie - Ostróda - J. Szeląg Wielki - J. Szeląg M. - Stare
- Jabłonki - K. Elbląski - Miłomłyn - K. Iławski - J. Dauby - J. Jeziorak - IŁAWA

=== Sail trails ===
- Trail of Iława and Elbląg canal - IŁAWA - Makowo - Zatoka Kraga - Lake Dauby - Lake Karnickie - Miłomłyn - K. Elbląski - J. Drwęckie
- Trail of Jeziorak and Płaskie Lake - IŁAWA - Siemiany - Jerzwałd
- Trail of Lake Jeziorak and Ewingi - IŁAWA - Siemiany - Matyty - Dobrzyki - Zalewo
- Trail of Iława and Elbląg canal - IŁAWA - Makowo - Zat. Kraga - K.Iławski - Miłomłyn - K. Elbląski

== Notable residents ==
- Daria Abramowicz (born 1987), sports psychologist
- Richard Altmann (1852–1900), pathologist
- Erich Diestel (1892–1973), Wehrmacht general
- Karl Heinemann (1857–1927), German literary historian and philologist
- Friedrich Karst (1893–1975), general
- Mirosław Kochalski (born 1965), mayor of Warsaw
- Jarosław Kotewicz (born 1969), high jumper
- Joachim Meichssner (1906–1944), Wehrmacht officer and resistance fighter
- Johann von Posilge (c.1340–1405), priest and chronicler
- Paul Semrau (1915–1945), Luftwaffe pilot
- Helmuth Stieff (1901–1944), Wehrmacht general and resistance fighter
- Gustav Wilke (1898–1977), Fallschirmjäger general

== Gallery ==
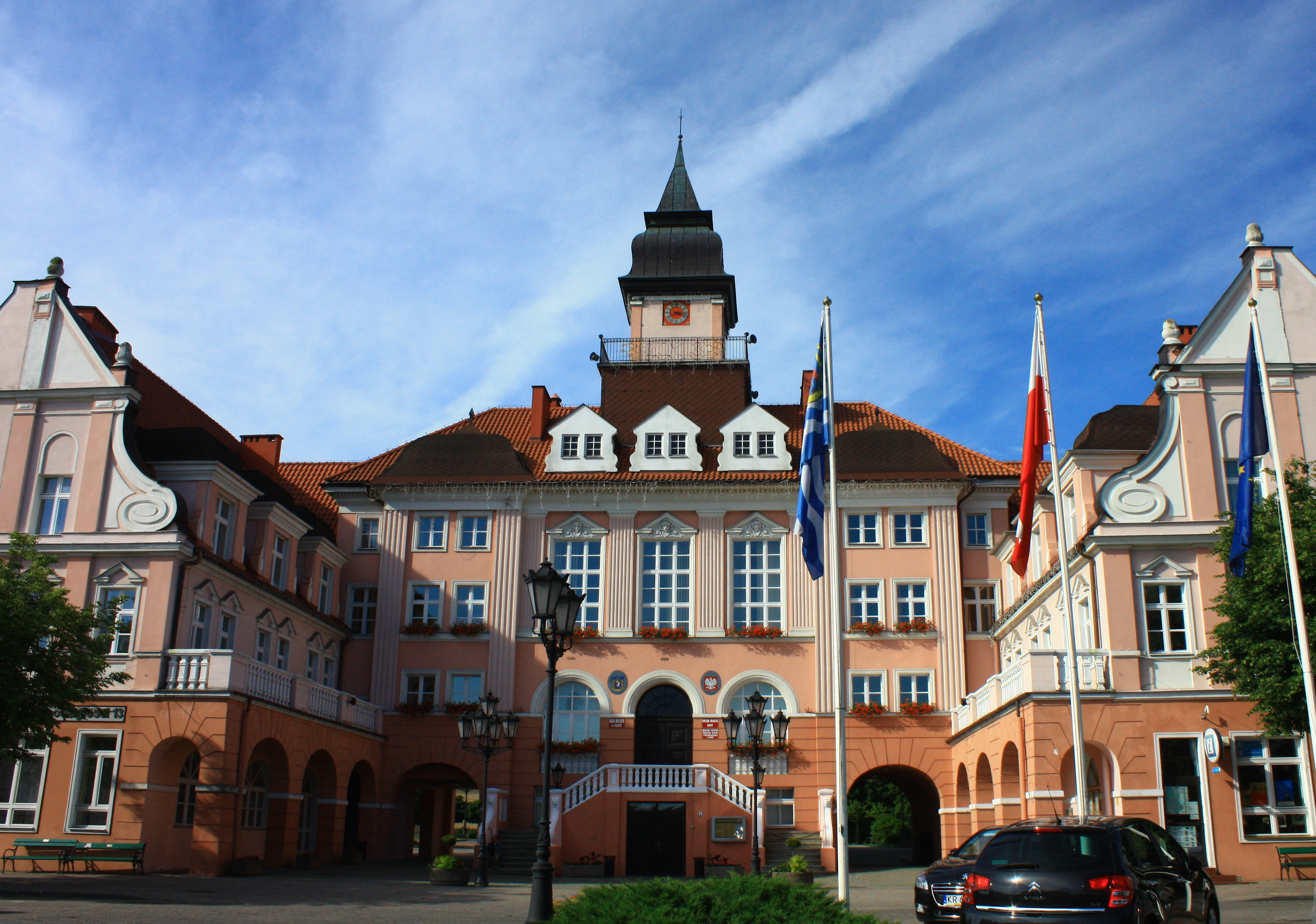
Iława town hall

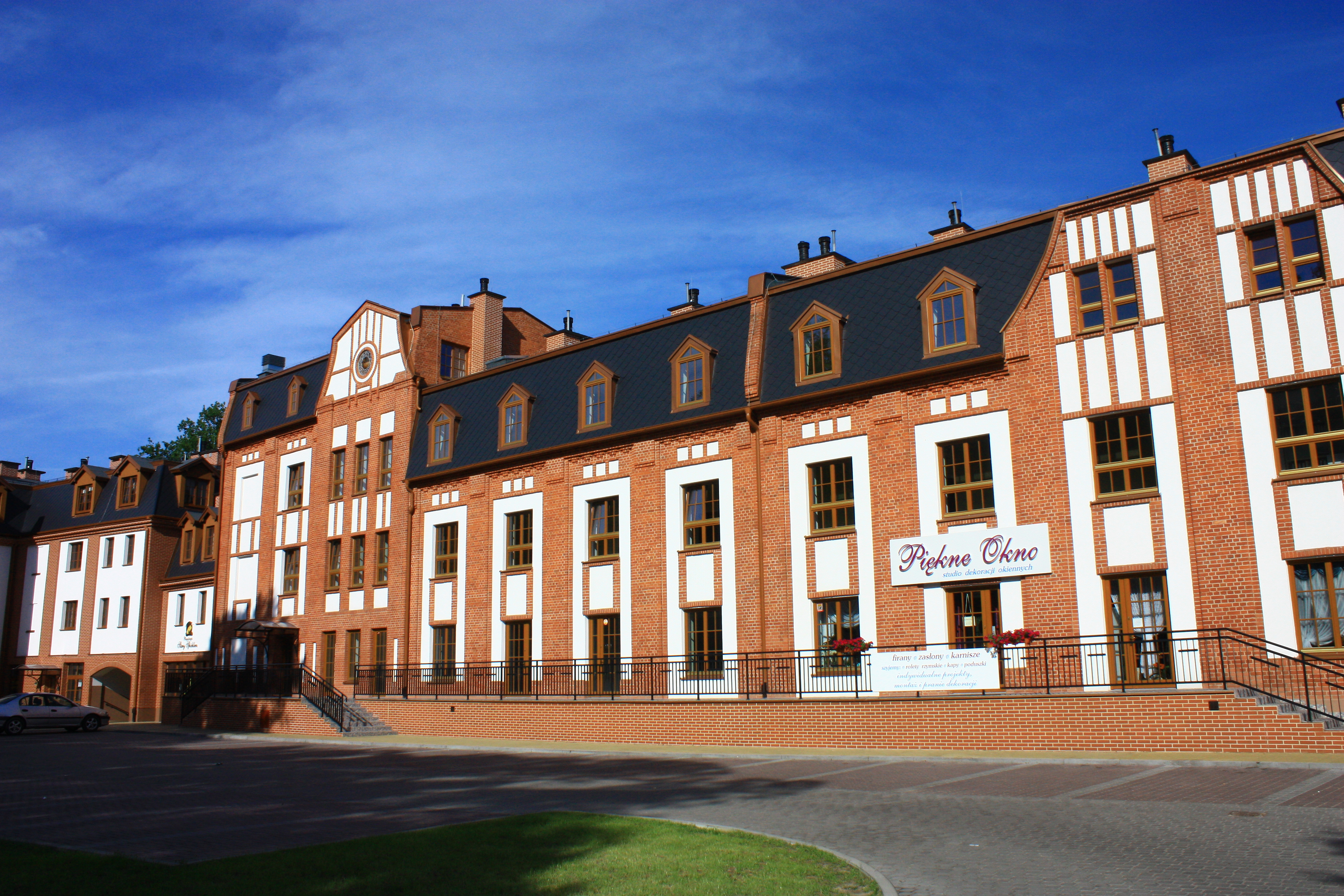
Former granary at Sobieskiego Street

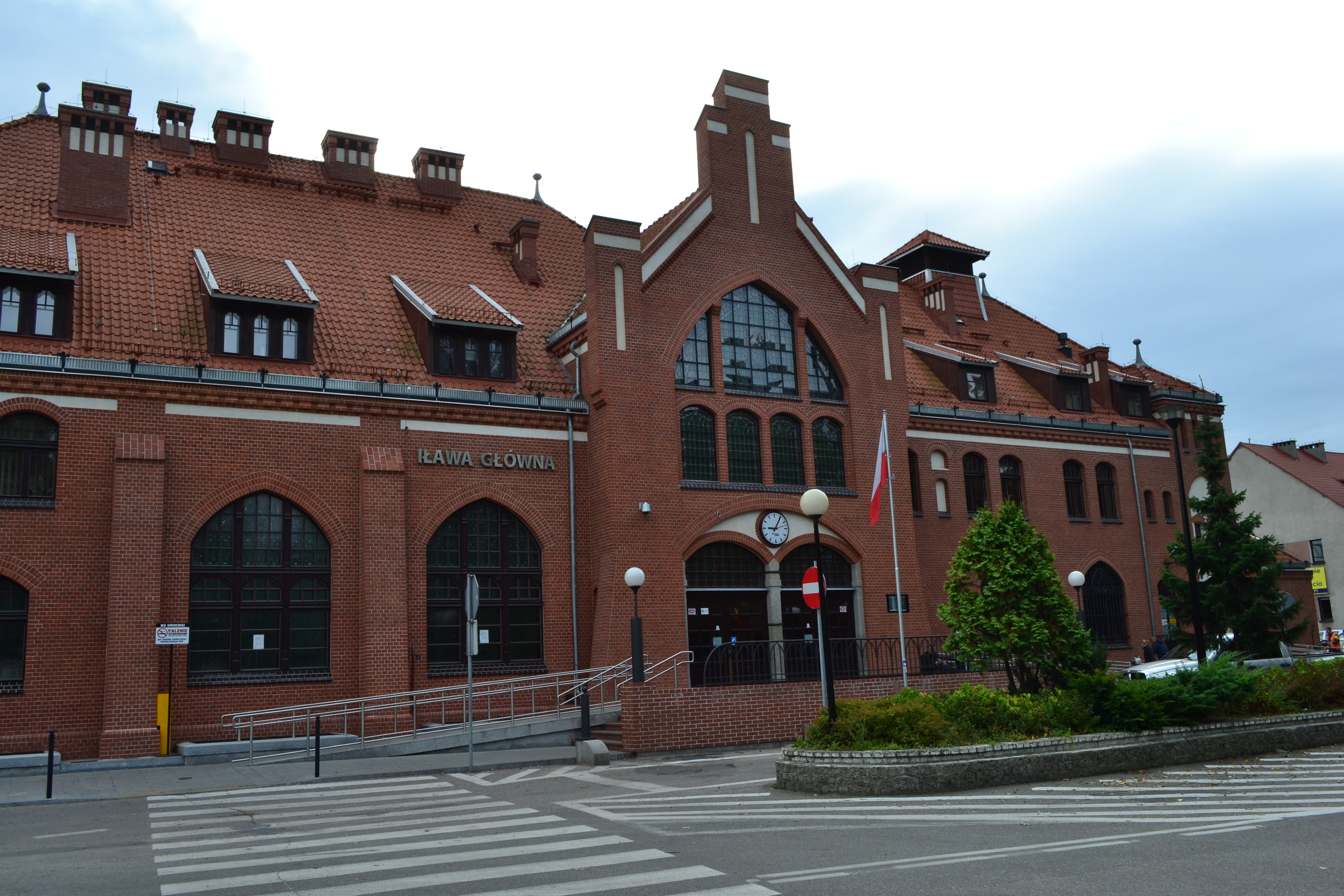
Iława Główna train station

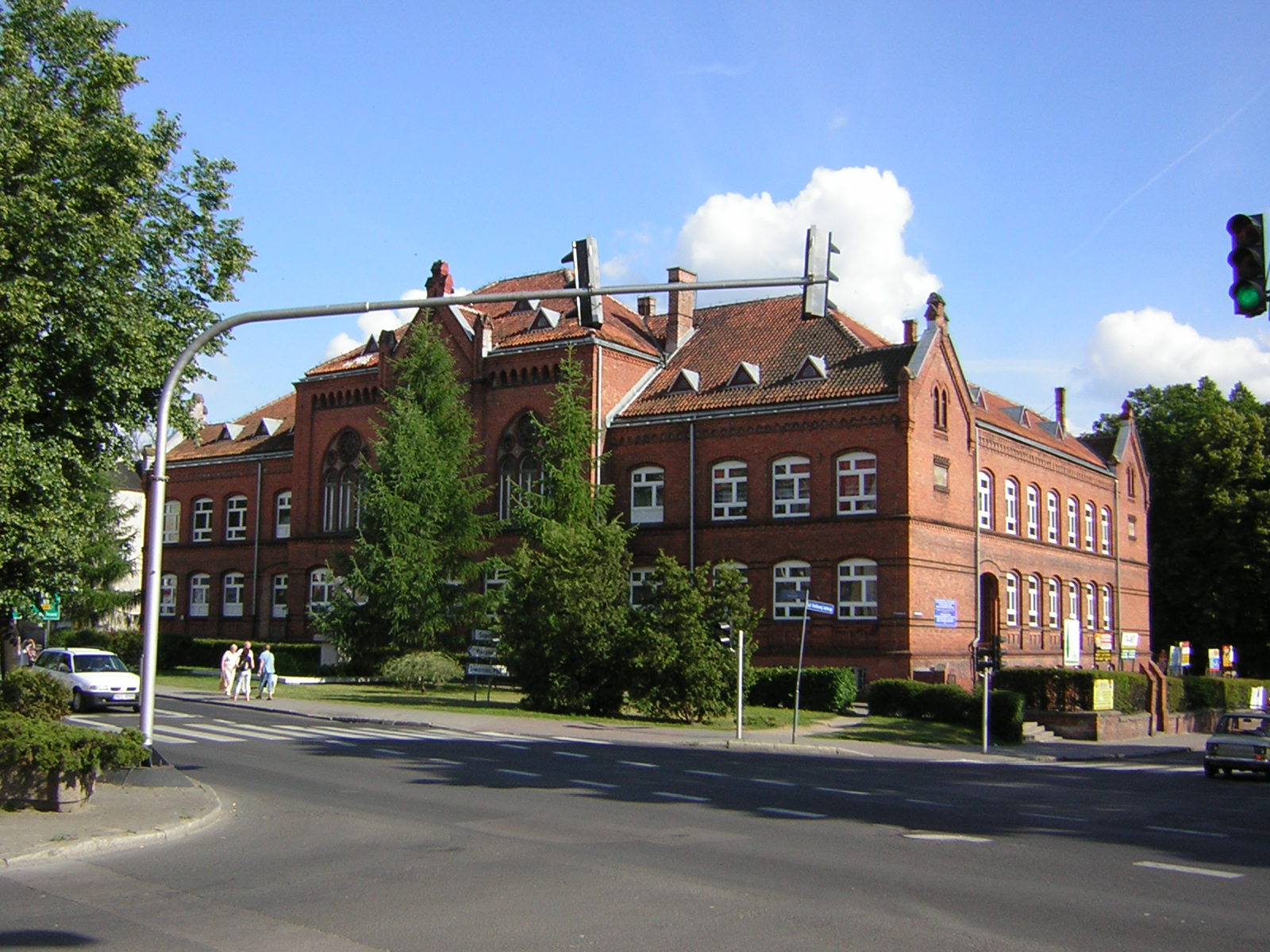
High school in Iława

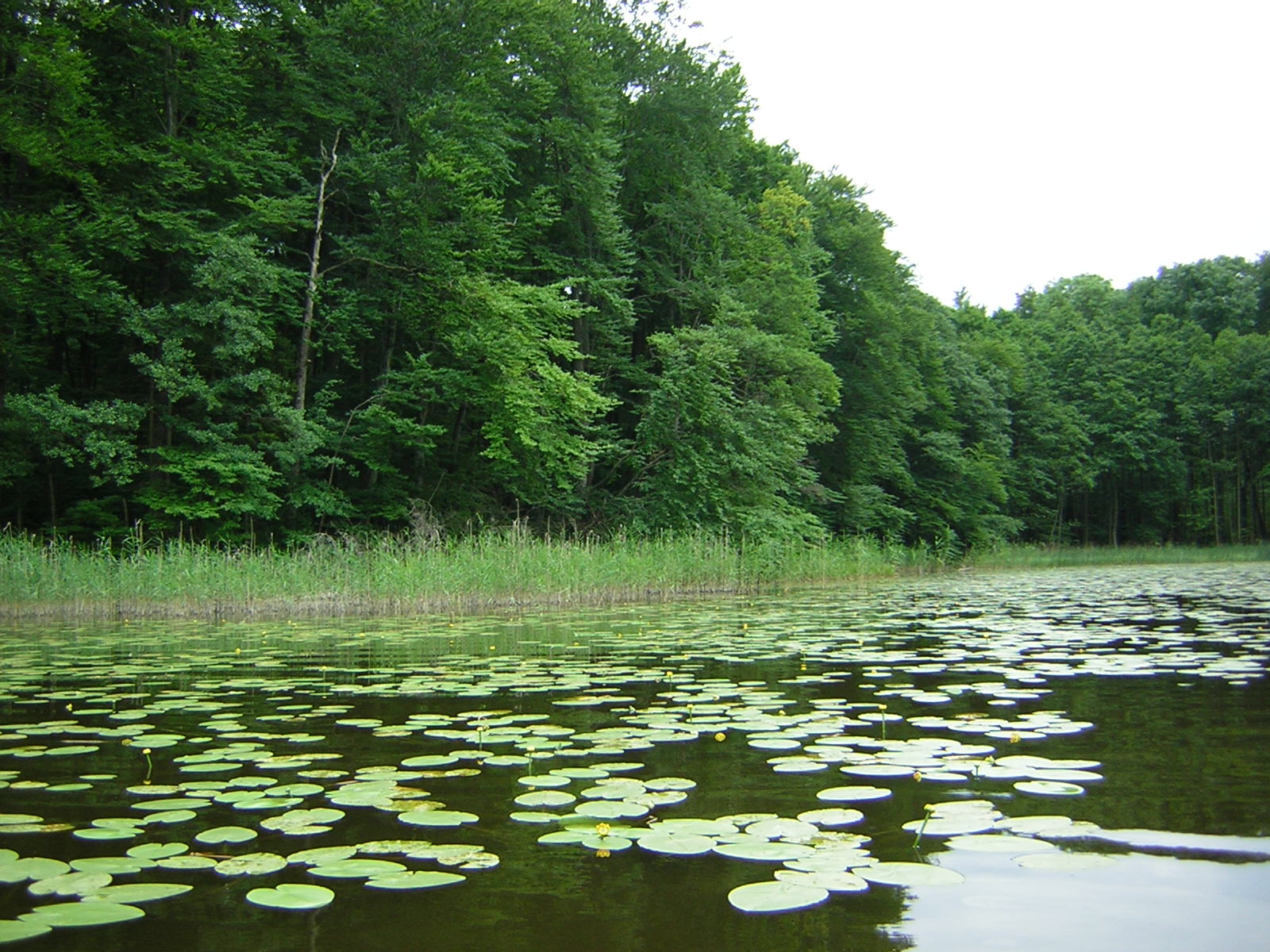
Jeziorak lake

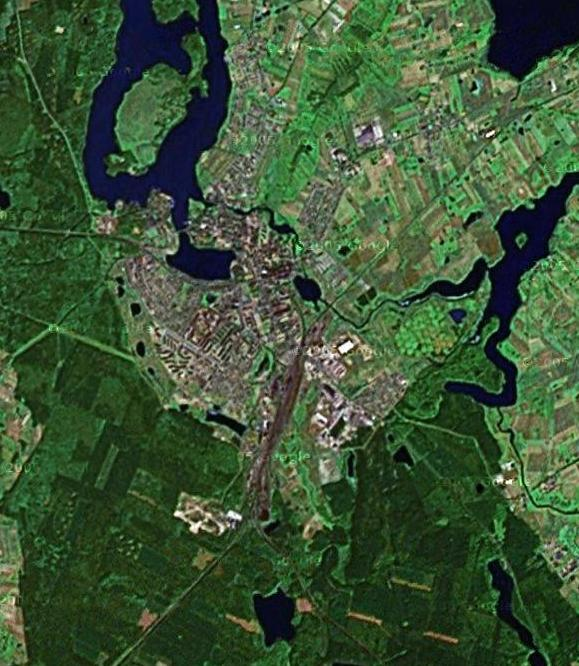
View from space

== International relations ==
=== Twin towns — Sister cities ===
Iława is twinned with:

- Herborn (Germany)
- Tholen (Netherlands)
- Gargždai (Lithuania)
