= Majdany =

Majdany may refer to several places:

- Majdany, Kuyavian-Pomeranian Voivodeship (north-central Poland)
- Majdany, Kutno County in Łódź Voivodeship (central Poland)
- Majdany, Piotrków County in Łódź Voivodeship (central Poland)
- Majdany, Lublin Voivodeship (east Poland)
- Majdany, Masovian Voivodeship (east-central Poland)
- Majdany, Koło County in Greater Poland Voivodeship (west-central Poland)
- Majdany, Konin County in Greater Poland Voivodeship (west-central Poland)
- Majdany, Gmina Zaniemyśl, Środa County in Greater Poland Voivodeship (west-central Poland)
- Majdany, Pomeranian Voivodeship (north Poland)
- Majdany Małe
- Majdany Wielkie
