= Karl Friedrich Giese =

Polish politician

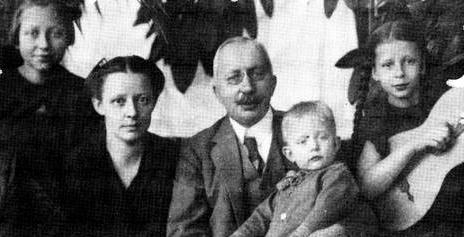

Mayor of Iława
- In office 1910–1933

Personal details
- Born: March 5, 1879
- Died: March 5, 1945 (aged 66) Świnoujście

Karl Friedrich Giese - (born. 5 March 1879 in Węgorzewo, died. 5 March 1945 in Świnoujście) was mayor of Iława from 1910 to 1933.

== Before elections ==
He was the son of the evangelical pastor Hermann Giese. He studied law in Szczecin. After graduation, he came to Iława as a court assessor, where he was elected mayor on 6 June 1910. He was 23 years in office.

== Elections ==
The City Council was headed by the Mayor, Karl Friedrich Giese. His deputy was a member of the (German National People's Party), chemist Rievers, known from the plebiscite period. The board members were Allzat, Brockob, Filzek and Seifert. The City Council had 21 councilors and its chairman was the merchant Falk. Both the Board and the City Council were politically pluralistic. Among the four members of the Municipal Executive there was onesocial democrat (SPD), one member of the People's Party and two conservatives. Among the 21 members of the City Council there was one fascist, thirteen conservatives, four social democrats, one communist, one centre (Zentrum), one democrat and one people's man. There was also one representative of the craft and two members of the economic party. This political pluralism did not prevent the Board and the City Council from making very far-sighted and prospective decisions that were beneficial for the city. Such decisions also include the free transfer of building plots to industrial or manufacturing plants, the transfer of plots of land for the construction of public buildings on very convenient terms, and finally the free transfer of plots of land to the garrison for the development of recreational and tourist infrastructure. At meetings of the City Board and the City Council, decisions were taken by a majority of votes. With a predominance of Conservatives both in the same body and in the other, it might not have been difficult to obtain such a majority. Only that first the mayor had to get the majority for these decisions and the majority, and this task was for the mayor. A lot depended on his authority. The fact that the mayor of Giese joyed such an authority mainly among the town's inhabitants is proved by the fact that in 1922 he was elected for a second, twelve-year term. For the first time Karl Friedrich Giese was elected mayor of Ilawa on 6 June 1910, for the second time in 1922, and it was only the take over of power by the Nazis in 1933 that did not allow him to survive until the end of his term. The term of office of the City Board and City Council lasted six years. We do not know whether the elections to the Board and Council also took place in 1910, that this was the case, can be seen from the mention of the pastor of the Catholic parish in Ilawa, who said that in 1930, by the votes of four Protestants and two Catholics, he was elected to the City Council. This would mean that this year there were elections for a new Board and a new City Council, which in turn means that Giese, during his more than twenty years as mayor in Iława, had to work with four different or almost different teams of people, consisting of the City Board and City Council. Following the mention of Fr. Maier can be assumed that the elections to the City Council took place in 1910, the next ones were in 1916, but probably due to the war they were postponed to 1918, while the next ones took place in 1924 and 1930. When choosing these people, they probably remembered their recent active participation in the plebiscite fight for Germany.

== Accomplishments ==
Ilawa, at the time of the mayor of Giese, from a provincial town turned into one of the most important centres of West Prussia. During his reign, many significant objects were created and have survived to this day. The best example is the neo-Baroque town hall built between1910-1912. During the finishing of the building, he took part in the following activities iławski military garrison, which funded the stained-glass windows and equipped the town hall at that time the richestiławian - Seifert. Giese lived in the southern part of the town hall. Giesegot married on March 5. Together with his wife, he received guests -the then elite - in the town hall building. Mayor Giese was remembered as a good manager and an excellent, brave politician. Its popularity continued to grow, as can be seen from the results of the second term elections. After World War I, Germany experienced an economic crisis, but Iława managed to prevent it. The mayor has begun extensive work. Between 1921 and 1922, the city hall (Stadthalle) was built, which now houses a cinema and theatre.

== Later life ==
Karl Giese in his memoirs written down in Świnoujście, where he worked as a lawyer and lived until his death on March 5, 1945. Iława's relationship with Jeziorak, consisting in the mutual dependence of the town and the lake, was described as follows: "The location of Ilawa by Jeziorak was always described as a gift of fate."
