= Liksajny =

- Village
- Location within Poland
- Coordinates: 53°48′N 19°47′E
- Country: Poland
- Voivodeship: Warmian-Masurian
- County: Ostróda
- Gmina: Miłomłyn

Liksajny [likˈsai̯nɨ] is a village in the administrative district of Gmina Miłomłyn, within Ostróda County, Warmian-Masurian Voivodeship, in northern Poland. The village is situated at the southern end of Lake Ruda Woda, near the entrance to the Elbląg Canal.
