= Wielka Żuława =

Island in Lake Jeziorak

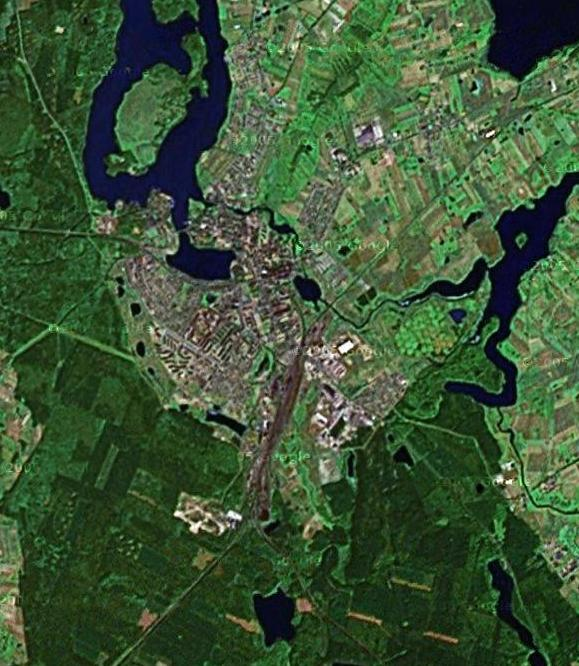
- Satellite photo of Iława. On the top left there is Wielka Żuława
- Interactive map of Wielka Żuława

Geography
- Location: Jeziorak
- Coordinates: 53°36′36″N 19°33′00″E
- Area: 0.824 km^{2} (0.318 sq mi)

Administration
- Poland
- Voivodeship: Warmian-Masurian Voivodeship
- County: Iława County
- Largest settlement: Iława

Wielka Żuława or Wielki Ostrów (German: Groß Werder) is the largest island in Lake Jeziorak and one of the largest mainland islands in Poland. Administratively it belongs to Iława. The island has six resorts.

On the south-eastern shore of the island, there are relics of a medieval Teutonic stronghold serving as a small watchtower, the period of use of which dates back to the 13th century. In the Middle Ages, a wooden bridge connected the island to the mainland. At the very top of the hillfort, there are remains of a small Protestant cemetery from the 19th century.

Wielka Żuława was the filming place of Gniazdo (The Cradle), a 1974 historical drama film about the reign of Mieszko I of Poland, directed by Jan Rybkowski.

== See also ==
- Iława
- Jeziorak
