= Włodzimierz Ptasznik =

Wlodzimierz Ptasznik (born April 26, 1947, Dyniska - Lubelskie Voivodeship, Poland) is a Polish politician, he has a Ph.D. in agricultural sciences and has been the mayor of Iława since 2006.

== Biography ==
He was an active athlete in 1968-1979 and a member of the Polish national team in athletics. He was a sprinter (mainly a 100m runner). He represented AZS Olsztyn. He trained under the guidance of a well-known athlete and coach from Olsztyn - Leopold Szczerbicki.

In 1970 he graduated from Wyzsza Szkola Rolnicza in Olsztyn (which was later renamed as Akademia Rolniczo-Techniczna of Michal Oczapowski). In 1976 he got a Ph.D. in agricultural sciences on the basis of his dissertation about the decreases in seed mass in processing processes carried out in the Olsztynskie Przedsiebiorstwo Hodowli Roslin and Nasiennictwa in Olsztyn. In 1976-1989 he was a lecturer at the Akademia Rolniczo-Techniczna of Michal Oczapowski in Olsztyn. From 1989 until 1992 he was the Associate Dean of the Mechanical Engineering Department at the mentioned academy. At the same time, he was also the director of the Zaklad Eksploatacji Maszyn Przemyslu Spozywczego.

He participated in academic trainings in Russia (Institute of Agricultural Engineering), Great Britain (Silsoe College) and the United States (Cornell University, Geneva Agricultural Experimental Station). Beginning in 1993, he was a consultant in science and technology for Known You Seed Co. in Kaohsiung in Taiwan where he would introduce and monitor modern technologies. He was a frequent participant of conferences and scholarly seminars in the United States, Canada, Great Britain, France, the Netherlands, Germany and Taiwan.

He was a specialist in entrepreneurship in 2002 in the Office of the Marshal of the Warminsko-Mazurskie Voivodeship in Olsztyn. In 2003 he was the director at the Department for European Integration at the City Hall of Iława. In 2004 he became the director of the Lokalna Organizacja Turystyczna Pojezierza Ilawskiego and Dorzecza Drwecy.

In 2006 he was elected mayor of Iława. He was supported by the Civic Platform party. He won in the first round by gathering 62,08% of all of the votes (turnout- 41,91%).

He is a supervisor of many M.A. dissertations and an author of several dozen national and international publications.

== Family ==
He is married and has two sons.

== Publications ==
- W. Ptasznik, S. Zygmunt, T. Kudra, Simulation of RF-assisted convective drying for broad bean seed quality. Drying Technology, New York 1990.
- Influence of matriconditioning and convection drying on snap bean seed quality, Taiwan Seeds Trade Association 1994, nr 14.
- W. Ptasznik, J. Barnard, W. Giec, A. Khan, Susceotibility of bean seeds to thermal-impact damage, Journal of Agricultural Engineering Research 1995, nr 61.
