= Luigi =

Luigi most commonly refers to:

- Luigi (given name), an Italian masculine name (includes a list of people with the name)
- Luigi (character), a video game character in the Mario franchise

Luigi may also refer to:

== People ==
- Luigi (jazz dancer), stage name of Eugene Louis Faccuito (1925–2015), American jazz dancer, choreographer, and teacher
- Luigi Verderame (born 1950), Belgian singer often known mononymously
- Luigi Mangione (born 1998), American man who killed Brian Thompson, sometimes referred to mononymously
- Abbot Luigi, a talking statue in Rome

== Fictional characters ==
- Luigi (character), a video game character in the Mario franchise
- Luigi (Cars), 1959 Fiat 500 in the Pixar movie Cars
- Luigi Risotto, a minor character from The Simpsons
- Luigi (Coronation Street), a recurring character in the UK TV series Coronation Street

== Music ==
- "Luigi", single by Louis Prima and His Orchestra, written Antonio, Araco, L. Di Leo 1953
- "Luigi", song from The Crooked Mile (musical) 1959

== Other uses ==
- Luigi Island, an island in Franz Josef Land, Russian Federation
- Luigi series, a video game series

== See also ==
- Lugi
- Lugii
- Luige
- Weegee (disambiguation)
- Ligi (disambiguation)
