= Szymon Mika =

Polish jazz musician

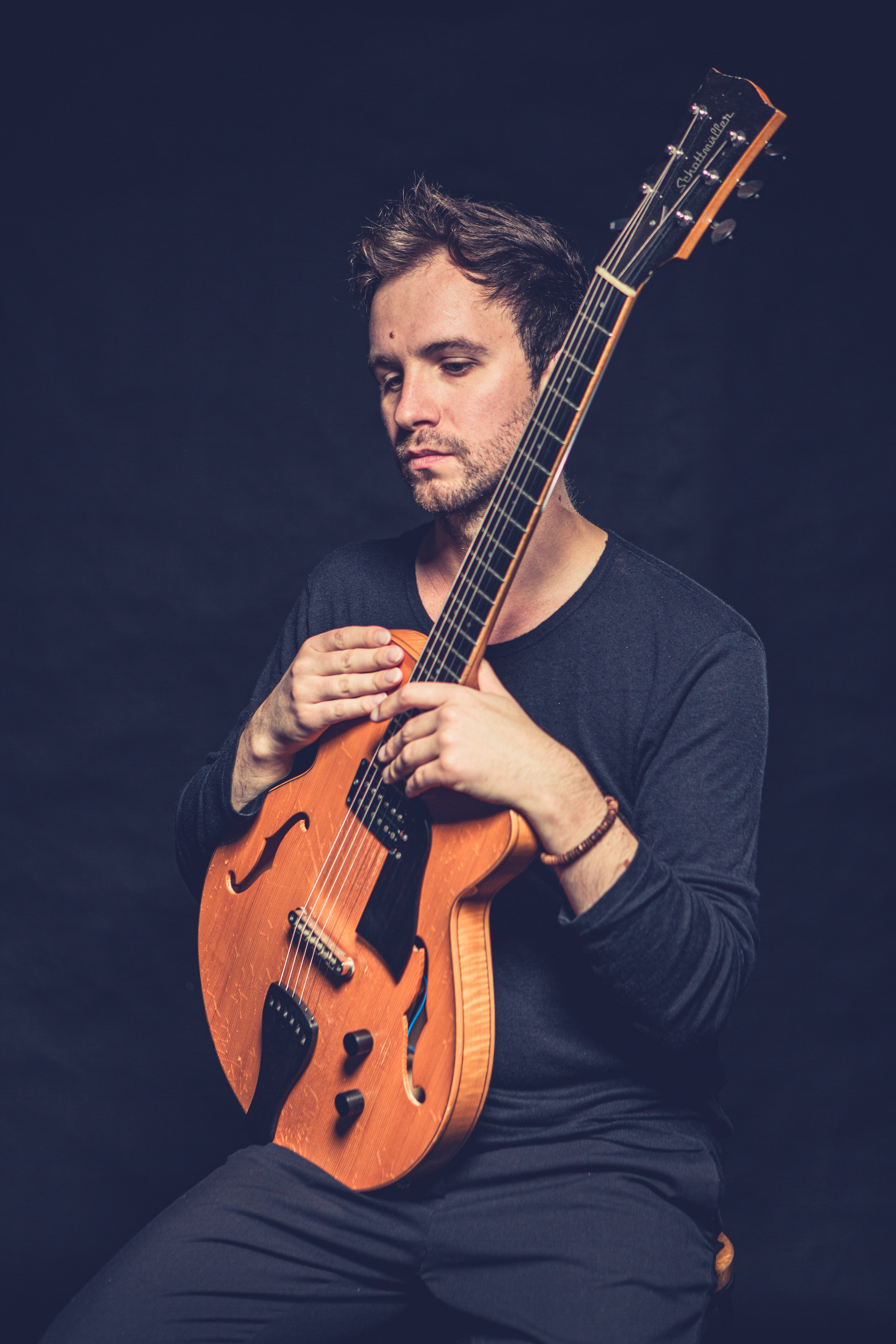
- Born: 14th of April 1991; Bielsko-Biała, Poland
- Style: Jazz

Szymon Mika (born April 14, 1991) is a Polish jazz guitarist, composer, and educator.

== Biography ==
He was born in Bielsko-Biała, Poland and grew up in Wadowice, where he was involved in music from an early age. At the age of four, he was already playing drums in his father's jazz band.

At the age of 11, he began studying classical guitar, taking lessons from, among others, Jarosław Dzień and Adam Zalas, gradually turning towards jazz guitar and music.

From 2010 to 2016, he studied jazz guitar under Prof. Karol Ferfecki at the Karol Szymanowski Academy of Music in Katowice, graduating with honors.

== Awards and distinctions ==
In 2012, he received the individual Grand Prix award "Jazz Personality" at the Jazz Nad Odrą Festival. That same year, he won 1st place at the Young Best Jazz competition with the band Organ Spot and received a special award for Best Soloist, as well as 2nd prize at the 5th Azoty Tarnów International Jazz Contest.

In 2013, he won the Grand Prix at the Grupa Azoty Jazz Contest with his original project Pałka/Mika Quartet and received the Special Award for the Most Promising Talent. In 2014, he was awarded a Special Prize at the Krokus Jazz Festival, and in 2015, another Special Prize at the Bielska Zadymka Jazz Festival.

In 2015, he won first prize at the International Jarek Śmietana Jazz Guitar Competition in Kraków, awarded by a jury including Mike Stern, Ed Cherry, Wojciech Karolak, and John Abercrombie. Fourteen artists from Poland, France, the USA, Israel, Hungary, Italy, Germany, and Japan were selected for the live auditions

In 2016, he began studies at the Music Academy Basel in Switzerland, where he studied under renowned musicians such as Wolfgang Muthspiel, Julian Lage, Peter Bernstein, Lage Lund, Lionel Loueke, Miguel Zenón, Guillermo Klein, Mark Turner, Larry Grenadier, Bill McHenry, and Aydin Esen.

From 2017 to 2018, he participated in the prestigious Focusyear scholarship program in Basel, during which he performed alongside artists such as Dave Holland, Kurt Rosenwinkel, Mark Turner, Joshua Redman, Avishai Cohen, Becca Stevens, Steve Swallow, Theo Bleckmann, Django Bates, and many others

== Artistic activity ==
Szymon Mika leads his own trio featuring bassist Max Mucha and drummer Ziv Ravitz. The group has released two albums: Unseen and Togetherness. He also leads a quintet that includes vocalist Song Yi Jeon (South Korea), trumpeter Oskar Török (Slovakia), drummer Péter Somos (Hungary), and bassist Andrzej Święs.

As a session musician, he collaborates with leading Polish and European artists such as Yumi Ito, Aga Zaryan, Ziv Ravitz, Grażyna Auguścik, Florian Arbenz, Piotr Wyleżoł, Adam Bałdych, and many others.

He has performed his music at numerous concerts in the United Kingdom, Germany, Switzerland, France, the Czech Republic, Slovakia, Hungary, Poland, Belarus, Ukraine, Lithuania, the United Arab Emirates, Italy, Ireland, Austria, Spain, and Portugal.

== Discography ==
=== As leader ===
- 2025 Agma – Szymon Mika
- 2022 Attempts – Szymon Mika Solo (selected as one of the 50 best albums of 2022 worldwide by Ted Gioia)
- 2018 Togetherness – Szymon Mika Trio & Guests
- 2016 Unseen – Szymon Mika Trio

=== As co-leader ===
- 2022 Loud Silence – Piotr Wyleżoł / Szymon Mika
- 2021 Ekual – Yumi Ito / Szymon Mika Duo
- 2020 Cavatina Session – WEBAND
- 2019 Short Form – Mateusz Pałka / Szymon Mika Duo
- 2015 Popyt – Mateusz Pałka / Szymon Mika Quartet

=== As sideman ===
- 2025 „NOW!" - Marek Pospieszalski Oktet
- 2025 „Oitago" - Organ Spot
- 2025 „Something Holy?" - Aleksandra Kryńska
- 2024 „Converasation #11 & #12" - Florian Arbenz
- 2023 „No Other End of the World Will There Be" - Marek Pospieszalski Oktet
- 2023 „Daily Things" - Tomasz Wendt Quartet
- 2022 „Sara" - Aga Zaryan (Nominated to a Fryderyk Award)
- 2022 „Polish Composers Of The 20th Century" - Marek Pospieszalski Oktet (album of the year of 2022, according to Jazz Forum magazine)
- 2019 "Visions" - Stanisław Słowiński Septet & Aukso
- 2019 "Miraż" - Adam Kawończyk Quartet
- 2018 "After This" - Focusyear Band
- 2018 "Discovery" - Marton Juhasz
- 2018 "Artisena" - Joachim Mencel Quintet
- 2018 „Camouflage" (music scores, compositions, performance) w reż. Aleksandry Świerk
- 2018 "Vital Music" - Mateusz Sobiechowski Quintet
- 2017 "Visions | Between Love and Death" - Stanisław Słowiński Sextet
- 2017 "Here" - Julia Kania 2017 "Time" - Przemek Kleczkowski Group
- 2017 "Into The Life" - Piotr Budniak Essential Group 2016 "Jestem mordercą" (music score, performance) - reż. Maciej Pieprzyca 2015 "Storytelling" - Ida Zalewska
- 2015 "Simple Stories About Hopes And Worries" - Piotr Budniak Essential Group
- 2015 "Moje Córki Krowy" (music score, guitar performance) - director. Kinga Dębska
- 2013 "Organ Spot" - Organ Spot collective

== Musical instruments ==
Since June 2012, Szymon Mika has been an endorser of guitars made by German luthier Stefan Schottmüller. He also plays a custom-made octave guitar crafted by Jakob Biehler, as well as an acoustic guitar built by Polish luthier Jacek Śliwa.

== Honors ==
In 2016, he was named "Hope of the Year" by readers of Jazz Forum magazine, and in 2022, he was awarded the title of "Guitarist of the Year" by the magazine's critics
