= Luigi Nono (disambiguation) =

Luigi Nono was an Italian composer.

Luigi Nono may also refer to:

- Luigi Nono (painter), the composer's grandfather

== See also ==
- Luigi (disambiguation)
- Nono (disambiguation)
