= Winiec, Ostróda County =

Winiec
- Village
- Location within Poland
- Coordinates: 53°49′N 19°51′E
- Country: Poland
- Voivodeship: Warmian-Masurian
- County: Ostróda
- Gmina: Miłomłyn

Winiec [ˈviɲɛt͡s] (German Winkenhagen) is a village in the administrative district of Gmina Miłomłyn, within Ostróda County, Warmian-Masurian Voivodeship, in northern Poland.
