= Liwa, Warmian-Masurian Voivodeship =

Liwa
- Village
- Location within Poland
- Coordinates: 53°43′50″N 19°49′33″E
- Country: Poland
- Voivodeship: Warmian-Masurian
- County: Ostróda
- Gmina: Miłomłyn
- Population: 710

Liwa [ˈliva] is a village in the administrative district of Gmina Miłomłyn, within Ostróda County, Warmian-Masurian Voivodeship, in northern Poland.
