= Gmina Miłomłyn =

Gmina Miłomłyn Miłomłyn Commune
- Gmina
- Coat of arms
- Interactive map of Gmina Miłomłyn
- Coordinates (Miłomłyn): 53°46′N 19°50′E
- Country: Poland
- Voivodeship: Warmian-Masurian
- County: Ostróda
- Seat: Miłomłyn

Area
  - Total: 160.91 km^{2} (62.13 sq mi)

Population (2006)
  - Total: 4,988
  - Density: 31.00/km^{2} (80.29/sq mi)
  - Urban: 2,305
  - Rural: 2,683
- Website: http://www.milomlyn.pl/

Gmina Miłomłyn is an urban-rural gmina (administrative district) in Ostróda County, Warmian-Masurian Voivodeship, in northern Poland. Its seat is the town of Miłomłyn, which lies approximately 12 kilometres (7 mi) north-west of Ostróda and 44 km (27 mi) west of the regional capital Olsztyn.

The gmina covers an area of 160.91 square kilometres (62.1 sq mi), and as of 2006 its total population is 4,988 (out of which the population of Miłomłyn amounts to 2,305, and the population of the rural part of the gmina is 2,683).

== Villages ==
Apart from the town of Miłomłyn, Gmina Miłomłyn contains the villages and settlements of Bagieńsko, Boguszewo, Bynowo, Dębinka, Faltyjanki, Gil Mały, Gil Wielki, Glimy, Kamieńczyk, Karnitki, Karnity, Ligi, Liksajny, Liwa, Lubień, Majdany Małe, Majdany Wielkie, Malinnik, Ostrów Wielki, Piławki, Rogowo, Skarpa, Skułty, Tarda, Wielimowo, Winiec, Wólka Majdańska, Zalewo, Zatoka Leśna and Ziemaki.

== Neighbouring gminas ==
Gmina Miłomłyn is bordered by the gminas of Iława, Łukta, Małdyty, Morąg, Ostróda and Zalewo.
