= Georg Steenke =

German architect

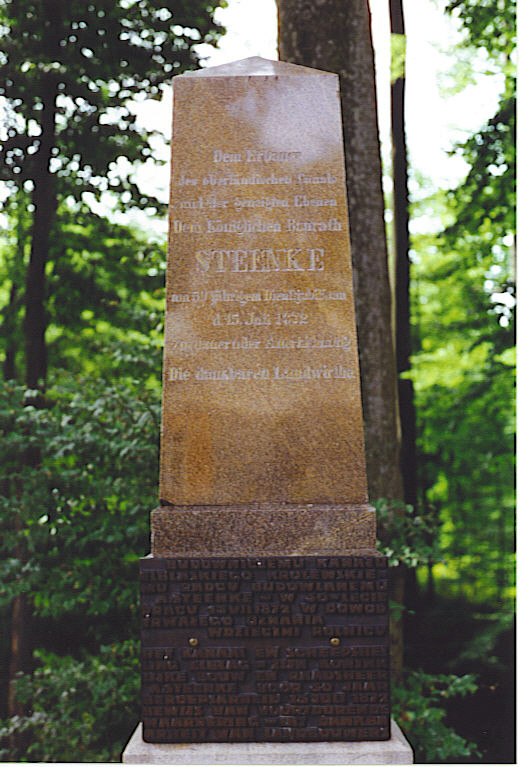
Georg Steenke's monument at Elbląg Canal: „Dem Erbauer des Oberländischen Canals und der geneigten Ebenen, dem königl. Baurath Steenke, zum fünfzigjährigen Dienstjubiläum, dem 15. Juli 1872, in dauernder Anerkennung. Die dankbaren Landwirthe“

Georg Jakob Steenke (30 June 1801 in Königsberg – 22 April 1884 in Elbing) was a German architect and a königlicher Baurat (royal construction councillor) of the Kingdom of Prussia. His father Johann Friedrich Steenke and his grandfather, both also from Königsberg, were involved with maritime trade.

In 1833 Steenke built a canal, the Seckenburger Kanal, in the Memel (Klaipėda) area. He designed the Oberländischer Kanal (now called Elbląg Canal), which was built between 1844–58 from the Drausensee (Drużno) to the Drewenz (Drwęca) River. Inaugurated in 1860, it connected the cities of Deutsch Eylau (Iława), Osterode (Ostróda), and Elbing (Elbląg). It connected territories with about 100 yard differences in height by putting ships on carriage carts on tracks and using pulley wheels and cables to have the ships glide up the hills.

From the time the canal was opened until his retirement, he resided at the Czulpa residence by Lake Ruda Woda.

A monument to honor Steenke was removed after the area became part of Poland in 1945. When UNESCO placed the canal on its list of architectural marvels, the monument was put up again in 1986.
