= Wólka Majdańska =

- Village
- Location within Poland
- Coordinates: 53°47′42″N 19°48′2″E
- Country: Poland
- Voivodeship: Warmian-Masurian
- County: Ostróda
- Gmina: Miłomłyn

Wólka Majdańska [ˈvulka mai̯ˈdaɲska] is a village in the administrative district of Gmina Miłomłyn, within Ostróda County, Warmian-Masurian Voivodeship, in northern Poland.
