= Ziemaki, Warmian-Masurian Voivodeship =

Ziemaki
- Settlement
- Location within Poland
- Coordinates: 53°46′30″N 19°52′8″E
- Country: Poland
- Voivodeship: Warmian-Masurian
- County: Ostróda
- Gmina: Miłomłyn

Ziemaki [ʑɛˈmaki] is a settlement in the administrative district of Gmina Miłomłyn, within Ostróda County, Warmian-Masurian Voivodeship, in northern Poland.
