= Kamieńczyk, Warmian-Masurian Voivodeship =

Kamieńczyk
- Village
- Location within Poland
- Coordinates: 53°45′28″N 19°47′59″E
- Country: Poland
- Voivodeship: Warmian-Masurian
- County: Ostróda
- Gmina: Miłomłyn

Kamieńczyk (Polish pronunciation: [kaˈmjɛj̃tʂɨk]) is a village in the administrative district of Gmina Miłomłyn, within Ostróda County, Warmian-Masurian Voivodeship, in northern Poland.
