= Dębinka, Warmian-Masurian Voivodeship =

Dębinka
- Village
- Location within Poland
- Coordinates: 53°45′N 19°47′E
- Country: Poland
- Voivodeship: Warmian-Masurian
- County: Ostróda
- Gmina: Miłomłyn

Dębinka [dɛmˈbinka] is a village in the administrative district of Gmina Miłomłyn, within Ostróda County, Warmian-Masurian Voivodeship, in northern Poland.
