= Zalewo, Ostróda County =

Zalewo
- Village
- Location within Poland
- Coordinates: 53°43′29″N 19°46′38″E
- Country: Poland
- Voivodeship: Warmian-Masurian
- County: Ostróda
- Gmina: Miłomłyn

Zalewo (Polish pronunciation: [zaˈlɛvɔ]) in the administrative district of Gmina Miłomłyn, within Ostróda County, Warmian-Masurian Voivodeship, in northern Poland.
