= Ligi (disambiguation) =

Ligi is a village in Ostróda County, Poland.

Ligi may also refer to:

== People ==
- Alessandro Ligi (born 1989), Italian footballer
- Jürgen Ligi (born 1959), Estonian politician
- Tony Ligi (born 1955), American politician and notable resident of Jefferson Parish, Louisiana
- Ligi Sao (born 1992), New Zealand professional rugby league footballer

== Places ==
- Ligi Ndogo S.C., a Kenyan association football club
  - Ligi Ndogo S.C. Academy, the club's youth academy
