= Lubień, Warmian-Masurian Voivodeship =

Lubień
- Settlement
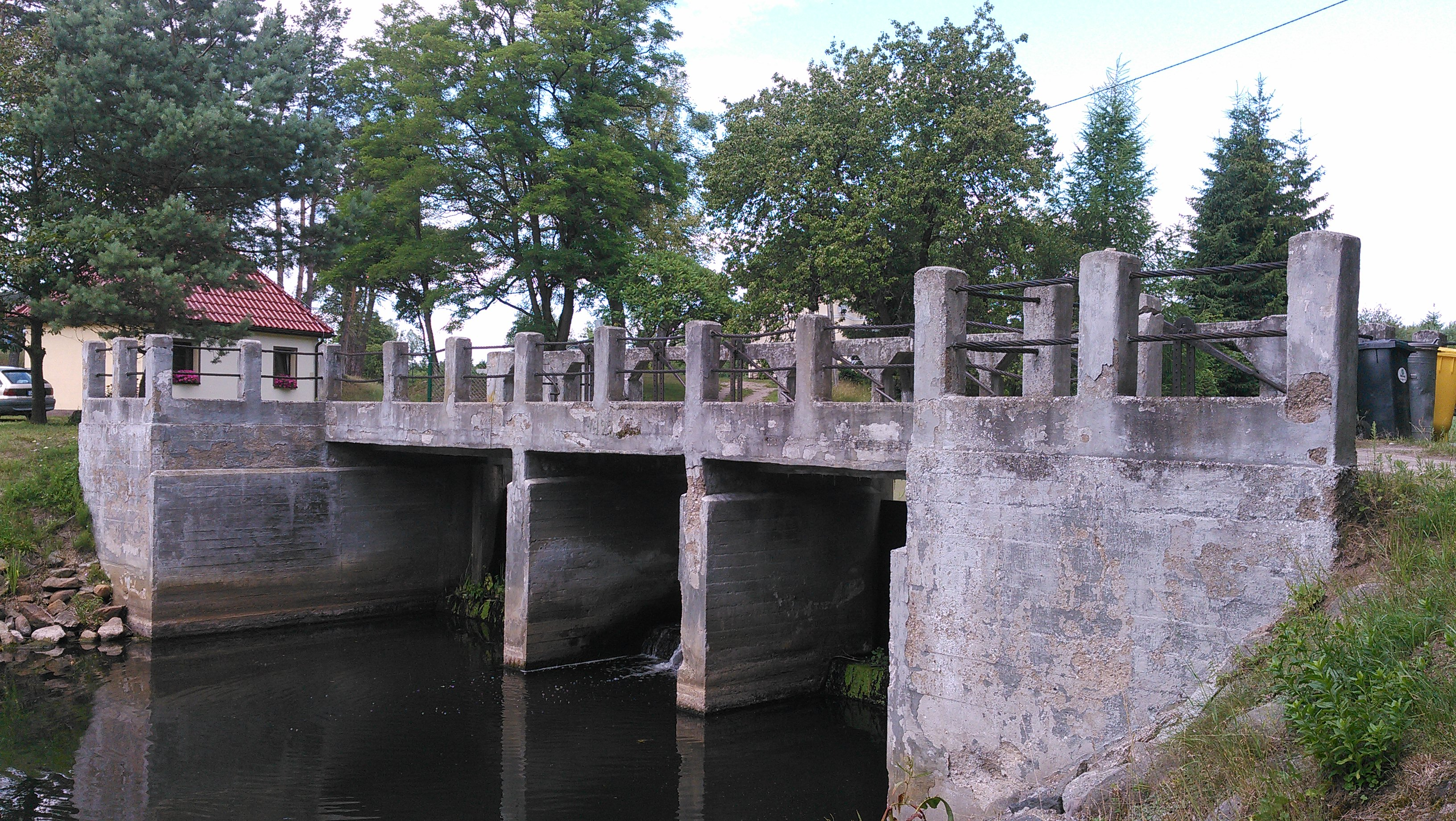

- Location within Poland
- Coordinates: 53°44′6″N 19°50′49″E
- Country: Poland
- Voivodeship: Warmian-Masurian
- County: Ostróda
- Gmina: Miłomłyn

Lubień (Polish pronunciation: [ˈlubjɛj̃]) is a settlement in the administrative district of Gmina Miłomłyn, within Ostróda County, Warmian-Masurian Voivodeship, in northern Poland.
