= Ostrów Wielki =

- Village
- Location within Poland
- Coordinates: 53°43′07″N 19°43′44″E
- Country: Poland
- Voivodeship: Warmian-Masurian
- County: Ostróda
- Gmina: Miłomłyn
- Population: 15

Ostrów Wielki (Polish pronunciation: [ˈɔstruv ˈvjɛlkʲi]) is a village in the administrative district of Gmina Miłomłyn, within Ostróda County, Warmian-Masurian Voivodeship, in northern Poland.
