= Bagieńsko =

- Settlement
- Location within Poland
- Coordinates: 53°45′43″N 19°52′44″E
- Country: Poland
- Voivodeship: Warmian-Masurian
- County: Ostróda
- Gmina: Miłomłyn

Bagieńsko [baˈɡʲɛɲskɔ] is a settlement in the administrative district of Gmina Miłomłyn, within Ostróda County, Warmian-Masurian Voivodeship, in northern Poland.
