= Iława Lakeland Landscape Park =

Protected area in northern Poland

Coordinates: 53.6033°N 19.5653°E

- Park Krajobrazowy Pojezierza Iławskiego
- IUCN category V (protected landscape/seascape)
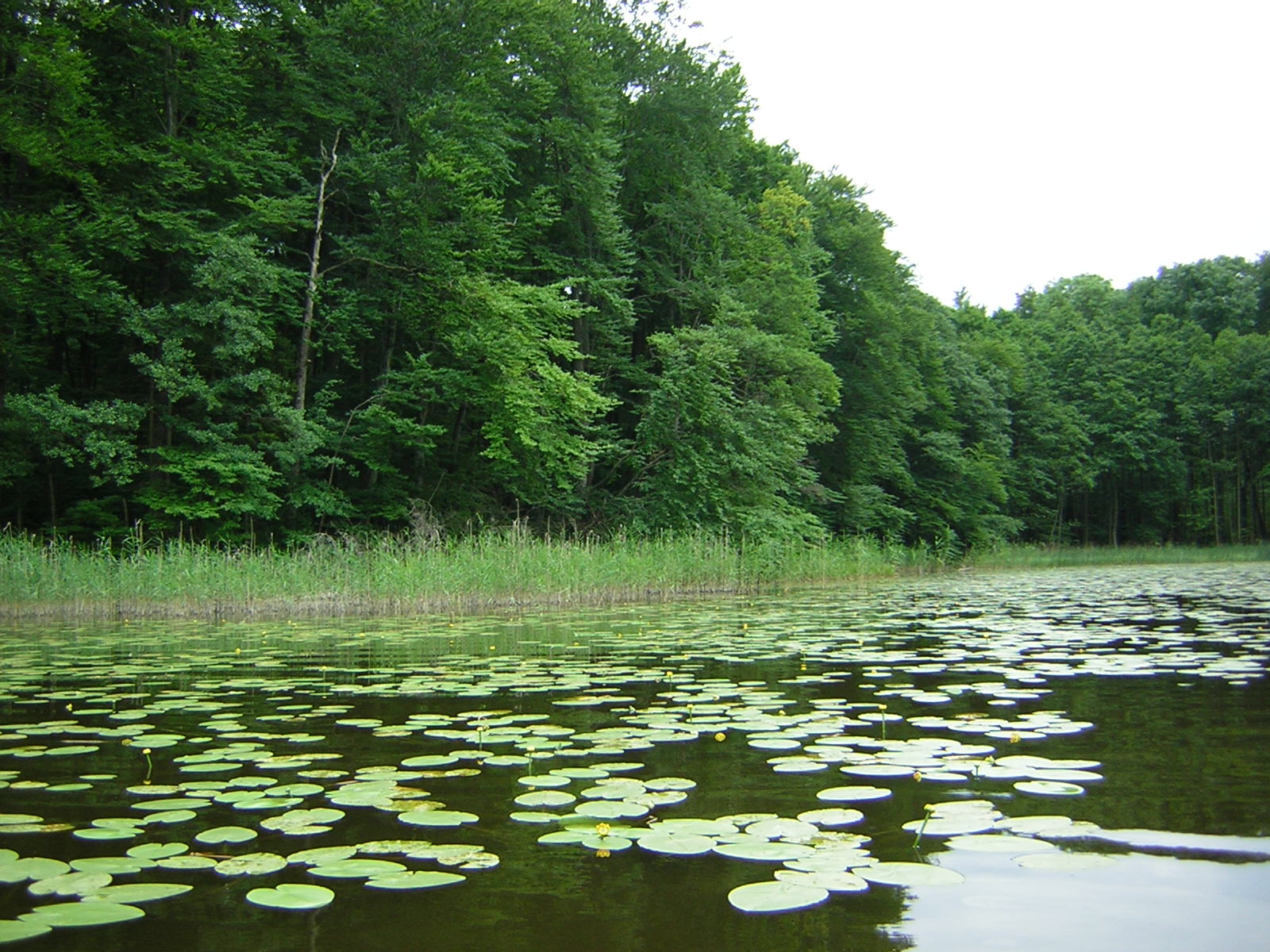
- Jeziorak lake at the Iława Lake District
- Interactive map of Iława Lakeland Landscape Park
- Location: northern Poland
- Area: 250.45 km^{2} (96.70 sq mi)
- Established: 1993

Iława Lakeland Landscape Park (Polish: Park Krajobrazowy Pojezierza Iławskiego) is a protected area (landscape park) in northern Poland. Established in 1993, the park is part of the geographic region called Pojezierze Iławskie (Iława Lakeland). It includes Jeziorak lake and the Lasy Iławskie (Iławskie Forest or Iława Woods, or Forests) spread out on the west side of Jeziorak. It covers the area of 250.45 square kilometres (96.70 sq mi).

The Park is shared between two voivodeships: Pomeranian Voivodeship and Warmian-Masurian Voivodeship. Within Pomeranian Voivodeship it lies in Sztum County (Gmina Stary Dzierzgoń). Within Warmian-Masurian Voivodeship it lies in Iława County (Gmina Iława, Gmina Susz, Gmina Zalewo).

Within the Landscape Park are three nature reserves.

== See also ==
- Landscape parks in Poland
- Natura 2000 in Poland
- Special Protection Areas in Poland
