= Skarpa, Warmian-Masurian Voivodeship =

Skarpa
- Village
- Location within Poland
- Coordinates: 53°47′22″N 19°45′37″E
- Country: Poland
- Voivodeship: Warmian-Masurian
- County: Ostróda
- Gmina: Miłomłyn

Skarpa [ˈskarpa] is a village in the administrative district of Gmina Miłomłyn, within Ostróda County, Warmian-Masurian Voivodeship, in northern Poland.
