= Rogowo, Gmina Miłomłyn =

Rogowo
- Village
- Location within Poland
- Coordinates: 53°42′39″N 19°48′29″E
- Country: Poland
- Voivodeship: Warmian-Masurian
- County: Ostróda
- Gmina: Miłomłyn

Rogowo [rɔˈɡɔvɔ] is a village in the administrative district of Gmina Miłomłyn, within Ostróda County, Warmian-Masurian Voivodeship, in northern Poland.
