= Karnitki =

- Village
- Location within Poland
- Coordinates: 53°44′47″N 19°43′28″E
- Country: Poland
- Voivodeship: Warmian-Masurian
- County: Ostróda
- Gmina: Miłomłyn

Karnitki [karˈnitki] is a village in the administrative district of Gmina Miłomłyn, within Ostróda County, Warmian-Masurian Voivodeship, in northern Poland.
