= Grażyna Auguścik =

- Born: 17 August 1955 (age 70); Słupsk, Poland
- Genres: Jazz
- Occupations: Singer, composer, arranger
- Years active: 1977–present
- Label: Gma
- Website: grazynaauguscik.com

Grażyna Auguścik (born 17 August 1955) is a Polish jazz vocalist, composer, and arranger. She frequently uses Polish folk music, Latin American music, and klezmer music.

== Career ==
Grażyna studied guitar in her native Słupsk, Poland. Later she studied singing, graduating in 1992 from Berklee College of Music in Boston.

Her singing debut took place in 1977 at a festival in Toruń. At the National Festival of Polish Song in Opole in 1979 she won in the category of first-time contestants. In 1981, she won prizes at the Student Festival of Song in Kraków and at the Festival of Traditional Jazz "Złota Tarka" in Warsaw.

In 1988, Grażyna moved to the United States, where she has performed with Michał Urbaniak and Urszula Dudziak, Jim Hall, Michael Brecker, Randy Brecker, John Medeski, Patricia Barber, Paul Wertico, Bobby Enriquez, Terry Callier, John McLean, Kurt Rosenwinkel, and Robert Irving III. She has participated in programs at the Jazz Institute of Chicago, bringing "traditional Eastern European music into the jazz idiom, providing a new link to the universality of the language of jazz". In 2002, 2003, 2004, and 2006 she was named Best Jazz Vocalist by the European magazine Jazz Forum. Auguścik has toured all over the world. Some of her albums have been highly acclaimed and popular with jazz audiences and have consistently been placed in Top 10 Charts (e.g. by the College Music Journal).

Grażyna has recorded 15 albums, including two with Urszula Dudziak, her fellow top-ranking Polish female jazz vocalist.

== Discography ==
- Sunrise Sunset (Polskie Nagrania Muza, 1988)
- Don't Let Me Go (GMA, 1996)
- Koledy with Urszula Dudziak (Voice Magic, 1996)
- Pastels with Bogdan Hołownia (GMA, 1997)
- Fragile (GMA, 2000)
- To I Hola (Selles, 2000)
- River (GMA, 2001)
- Past Forward (GMA, 2003)
- Lulajze: The Lullaby for Jesus (GMA, 2005)
- The Light (GMA, 2005)
- Live Sounds Live (GMA, 2007)
- Andanca with Paulinho Garcia (GMA, 2008)
- The Beatles Nova with Paulinho Garcia (Agencja Artystyczna MTJ, 2011)
- Man Behind the Sun (EMI, 2012)
- Szeptem (Agencja Artystyczna MTJ, 2016)

== See also ==
- List of jazz arrangers
