= Karl Heinemann =

German literary historian and philologist

Karl Heinemann (9 March 1857, in Deutsch-Eylau – 4 July 1927, in Leipzig) was a German literary historian and philologist.

He studied classical and German philology at the University of Leipzig. From 1882 he taught classes as a gymnasium teacher in Leipzig, receiving the title of professor in 1899. From 1892 onward, he was editor of the publication Blätter für literarische Unterhaltung, and from 1918 to 1927, he edited the Goethe-Kalender.

== Published works ==
- Ueber das Hrabanische Glossar (1881) – About a Hraban glossary.
- Briefe von Goethes Mutter an die Herzogin Anna Amalia (1889) – Letters from Goethe's mother to the Duchess Anna Amalia.
- Goethes briefe an frau von Stein nebst dem Tagebuch aus Italien (4 volumes, 1894) – Goethe's letters to Charlotte von Stein, together with the diary from Italy.
- Goethes Leben und Werke (1898) – Goethe's life and works.
- Goethes Werke (30 volumes, 1901–08) – Goethe's works.
- Klopstocks leben und werke (1904) – Friedrich Gottlieb Klopstock's life and works.
- Goethes Mutter : ein Lebensbild nach den Quellen (8th edition, 1909) – Goethe's mother, a biography according to sources.
- Die deutsche Dichtung, Grundriss der deutschen Literaturgeschichte (1910) – German poetry, outline of German literary history.
- Die klassische Dichtung der Griechen (1912) – The classical poetry of the Greeks.
- Die klassische Dichtung der Römer (1914) – The classical poetry of the Romans.
- Hundert Briefe Goethes : Briefe der Weisheit und Schönheit (1919) – 100 Goethe letters; Letters of wisdom and beauty.
- Die tragischen gestalten der Griechen in der weltliteratur (1920) – Tragic figures of the Greeks in world literature.
