= Miłomłyn =

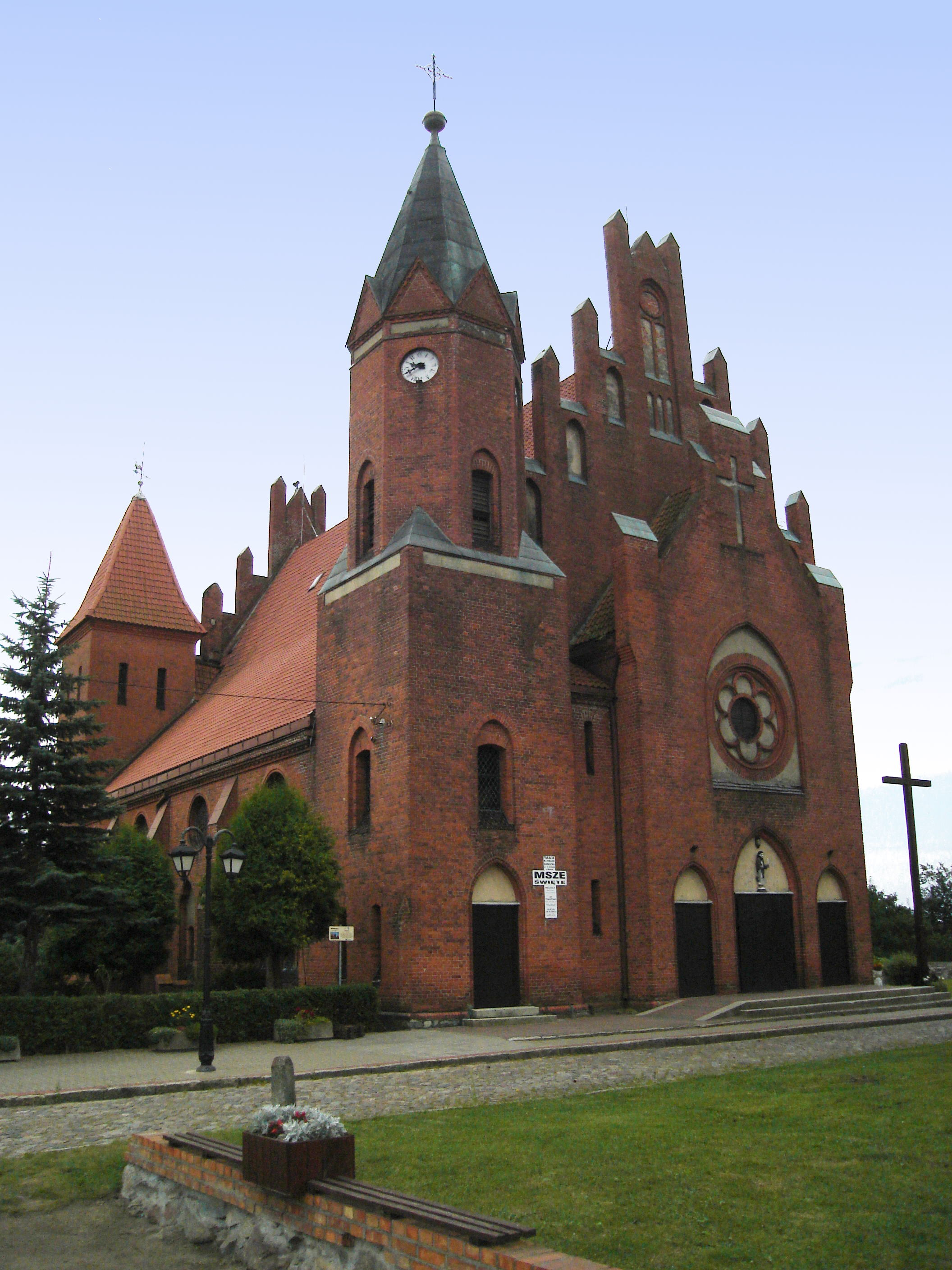
- Saint Bartholomew church in Miłomłyn

- Coat of arms

- Location within Poland
- Coordinates: 53°46′N 19°50′E
- Country: Poland
- Voivodeship: Warmian-Masurian
- County: Ostróda
- Gmina: Miłomłyn
- First mentioned: 1315
- Town rights: 1335

Government
  - Mayor: Stanisław Siwkowski

Area
  - Total: 12.4 km^{2} (4.8 sq mi)

Population (2010)
  - Total: 2,347
  - Density: 189/km^{2} (490/sq mi)
- Time zone: UTC+1 (CET)
  - Summer (DST): UTC+2 (CEST)
- Postal code: 14-140
- Area code: (+48) 89
- Vehicle registration: NOS
- Website: www.milomlyn.pl

Miłomłyn [mʲiˈwɔmwɨn] is a town in Ostróda County, Warmian-Masurian Voivodeship, Poland, with 2,347 inhabitants (2010).

Among the sights of Miłomłyn are the historic Saint Bartholomew church (built 1314) and the Elbląg Canal, which runs through the town.

Historically, it was known in Polish as Miłomłyn, Miłomłynek and Liwski Młyn.

== Demographics ==
Historical population

Year	Pop.	±%
1856	1,800	—
1871	2,201	+22.3%
1880	2,234	+1.5%
1890	2,150	−3.8%
1900	2,400	+11.6%

Year	Pop.	±%
1910	2,374	−1.1%
1925	2,105	−11.3%
1939	2,434	+15.6%
2010	2,347	−3.6%
