= Ligi =

- Village
- Location within Poland
- Coordinates: 53°45′50″N 19°44′44″E
- Country: Poland
- Voivodeship: Warmian-Masurian
- County: Ostróda
- Gmina: Miłomłyn
- Time zone: UTC+1 (CET)
  - Summer (DST): UTC+2 (CEST)
- Postal code: 14-140
- ISO 3166 code: POL
- Vehicle registration: NOSE

Ligi [ˈliɡi] is a village in the administrative district of Gmina Miłomłyn, within Ostróda County, Warmian-Masurian Voivodeship, in northern Poland.
