= Piławki =

- Settlement
- Location within Poland
- Coordinates: 53°44′29″N 19°53′52″E
- Country: Poland
- Voivodeship: Warmian-Masurian
- County: Ostróda
- Gmina: Miłomłyn
- Population: 20

Piławki [piˈwafki] is a settlement in the administrative district of Gmina Miłomłyn, within Ostróda County, Warmian-Masurian Voivodeship, in northern Poland.
