= Złota Tarka =

Music festival

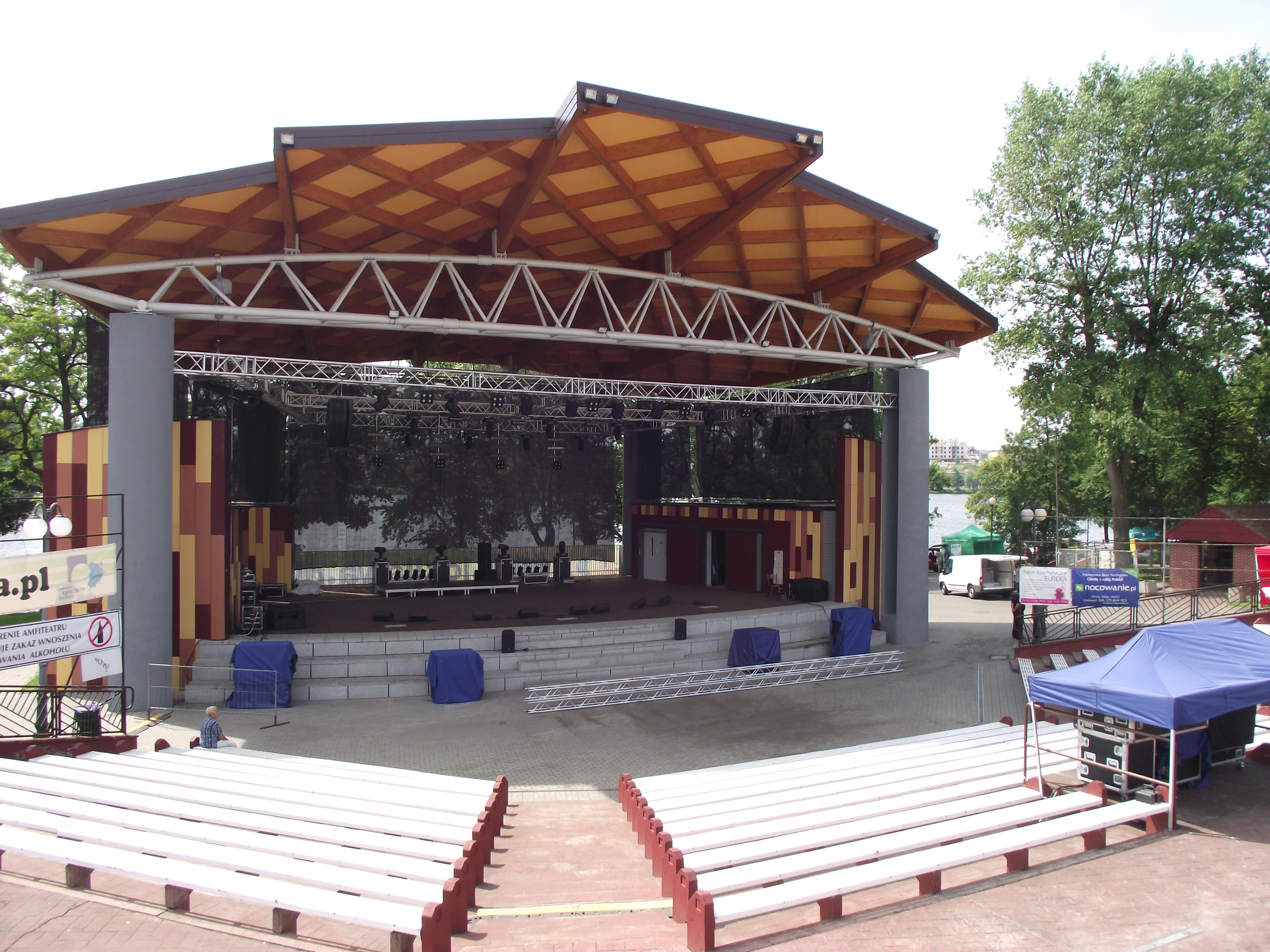
Louis Armstrong Amphiteatre in Iława, the present location of the festival

Złota Tarka (Golden Washboard) is the International Festival of Traditional Jazz "Old Jazz Meeting - Złota Tarka" (Polish: Międzynarodowy Festiwal Jazzu Tradycyjnego "Old Jazz Meeting - Złota Tarka"), the jazz contest during the festival, and the award in Poland. The name comes from the washboard as a musical instrument in traditional music. The festival traces from the award suggested to the Club of Traditional Jazz by the student cultural center Klub Stodoła in Warsaw.

This is one of the oldest musical festivals in Poland. The first award was given out during the Jazz on the Oder (pl:Jazz nad Odrą) festival in Wrocław in 1965. The history of the award and the festival consists of two periods separated by a hiatus: 1967–1987 in Warsaw and 1994-present in Iława. The name "Złota Tarka" was acquired in 1973 ("Old Jazz Meeting 'Złota Tarka'").

Currently, it is partly financed by the Polish Ministry of Culture and National Heritage.

2018 was the 48th installment of the festival/contest.
