= James Butler (military adventurer) =

James Butler (fl. 1631–1634) was an Irish military adventurer, one of the many members of the Irish house of Butler who, in the seventeenth century, gained reputation as soldiers. At least six officers of the name appear to be distinguishable in the imperial service during the Thirty Years' War. The James Butler in question is said to have belonged to the branch of his house which traced its origin to Richard Butler, 1st Viscount Mountgarret, the second son of Piers Butler, 8th Earl of Ormond.

== Career ==
=== Imperial service ===
He is first met with in Poland, where he levied at his own expense a regiment of not less than fifteen companies (ten being the usual number in the Imperial Army). Very possibly, since Gustavus Adolphus is said to have cherished a deadly hatred against him, he was the Butler who, after having in 1627 shared in a defeat of the Poles near Danzig, in the following year contributed to the Polish success against the Swedes at Osterode.

It was certainly he who, early in 1631, opportunely brought up his regiment, which had large number of Irishmen, including his kinsman Walter Butler, to Frankfort-on-the-Oder, in Silesia, where the imperialists under Tiefenbach were awaiting the approach of Gustavus Adolphus at the head of a much superior force. Before the arrival of the Swedes, James Butler, in order if possible to obtain more soldiers and supplies for Frankfort, proceeded to the camp of Tilly, who was marching upon Magdeburg. Butler came too late, but he appears to have taken part in the Sack of Magdeburg, the result of which terribly avenged the fall of Frankfort. After the capture of Magdeburg and before the Battle of Breitenfeld he appears to have rejoined Tiefenbach, who had invaded Lusatia with such forces as he could command, but whom the news of the great defeat of Tilly obliged to retreat into Bohemia, where he occupied Nimburg on the Elbe, November 1631. A Saxon army under Arnim having taken position on the other side of the river, Butler was with his Irish regiment, as it is now called, sent across a wooden bridge to fortify and hold the bridgehead on the enemy's side; and his defense, ending with the burning down of the bridge, was so vigorous that finally Arnim returned to Prague.

=== Mercenary ===
Not long afterwards, however, the Irish colonel, who had many adversaries or rivals, quit the imperial service, and, making use of the liberty which he had reserved to himself, returned into Poland, where he fought against the Muscovites in the Smolensk War. He was at least in so far consistent in his choice of side, that he served against an enemy who on principle excluded mercenaries professing the faith of Rome (Herrmann, Geschichte des Russischen Reiches, iii. 54).

After this nothing certain is known of him, for there seems no reason for accepting a conjecture which identifies him with a Butler said to have fallen at Ross in March 1642, fighting in the Irish Confederate Wars on the side of the Irish Catholics under General Preston against the royal troops under the head of his house James Butler, earl (afterwards marquis and twelfth duke) of Ormonde.
