= Weegee (disambiguation) =

Weegee is the pseudonym of American photographer Arthur Fellig.

Weegee, Wee Gee or Weegie may also refer to:

== People ==
- Weegie Thompson (born 1961), former American football player
- William "Wee Gee" Howard, former lead singer of The Dramatics
- Weegie, a demonym for people from Glasgow, Scotland

== Other uses ==
- WeeGee house, an art museum building in Espoo, Finland
- Weegee, a meme associated with YouTube Poops based on the character, Luigi.
- WDGY, nicknamed "WeeGee", a commercial AM radio station licensed to Hudson, Wisconsin, United States

== See also ==
- Ouija board, commonly pronounced as "weegee board"
- Wiigii, a popular expression in David Willis's webcomics
