= Majdany Małe =

- Settlement
- Location within Poland
- Coordinates: 53°47′33″N 19°50′15″E
- Country: Poland
- Voivodeship: Warmian-Masurian
- County: Ostróda
- Gmina: Miłomłyn

Majdany Małe (Polish pronunciation: [majˈdanɨˈ mawɛ]) is a settlement in the administrative district of Gmina Miłomłyn, within Ostróda County Warmian-Masurian Voivodeship, in northern Poland.
