= Gil Wielki =

- Settlement
- Location within Poland
- Coordinates: 53°42′38″N 19°43′27″E
- Country: Poland
- Voivodeship: Warmian-Masurian
- County: Ostróda
- Gmina: Miłomłyn

Gil Wielki (Polish pronunciation: [ɡʲil ˈvjɛlkʲi]) is a settlement in the administrative district of Gmina Miłomłyn, within Ostróda County, Warmian-Masurian Voivodeship, in northern Poland.
