= Majdany Wielkie =

- Village
- Location within Poland
- Coordinates: 53°48′N 19°47′E
- Country: Poland
- Voivodeship: Warmian-Masurian
- County: Ostróda
- Gmina: Miłomłyn

Majdany Wielkie (Polish pronunciation: [majˈdanɨ ˈvjɛlkʲɛ]) is a village in the administrative district of Gmina Miłomłyn, within Ostróda County, Warmian-Masurian Voivodeship, in northern Poland.
