= Sarnówek, Warmian-Masurian Voivodeship =

Sarnówek
- Village
- Location within Poland
- Coordinates: 53°39′34″N 19°35′17″E
- Country: Poland
- Voivodeship: Warmian-Masurian
- County: Iława
- Gmina: Iława

Sarnówek [sarˈnuvɛk] is a village in the administrative district of Gmina Iława, within Iława County, Warmian-Masurian Voivodeship, in northern Poland.
