= Elbląg Canal =

Canal in Poland

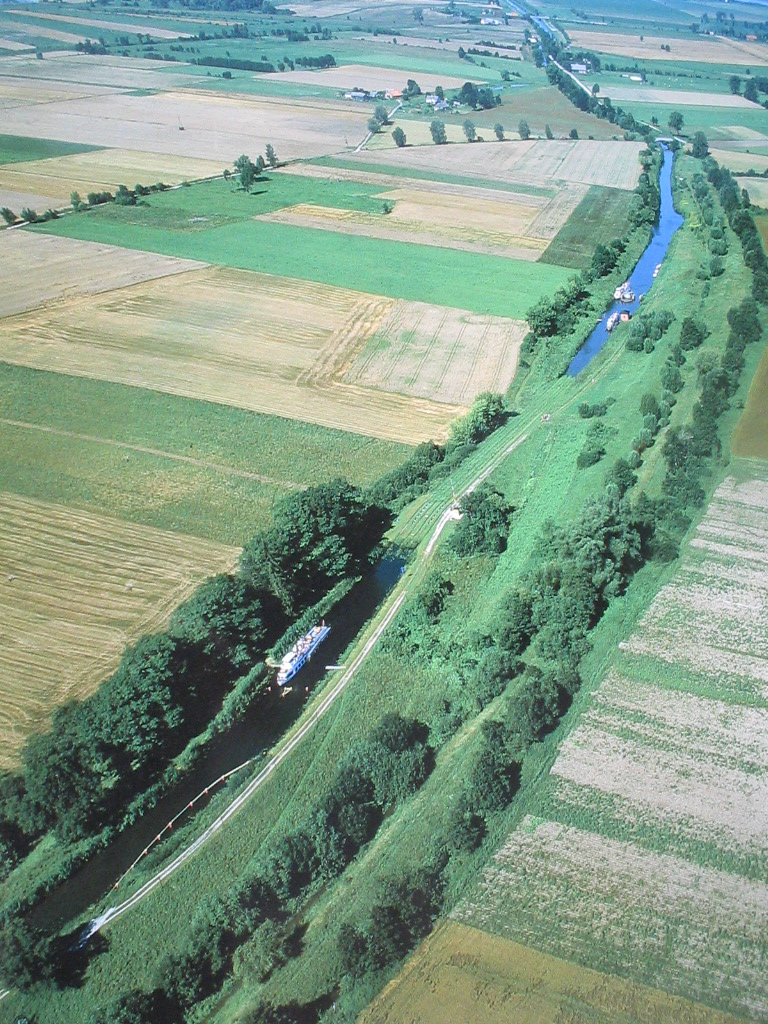
- Aerial view, showing one of the inclined planes
- Interactive map of Elbląg Canal
- Location: Warmian-Masurian Voivodeship
- Country: Poland

Specifications
- Locks: 4
- Maximum height AMSL: 99.5 m (326 ft)

History
- Construction began: 1844
- Date completed: 1860

Geography
- Beginning coordinates: 53.6996°N 19.8985°E
- Ending coordinates: 54.253°N 19.3828°E

Historic Monument of Poland
- Designated: 2011-01-14
- Reference no.: Dz. U. z 2011 r. Nr 20, poz. 100

Elbląg Canal (pronounced [ˈɛlblɔŋk]; Polish: Kanał Elbląski [ˈkanaw ɛlˈblɔ̃skʲi]) is a canal in Poland, in Warmian-Masurian Voivodeship, 80.5 kilometres (50.0 mi) in length, which runs southward from Lake Drużno (connected by the river Elbląg to the Vistula Lagoon), to the river Drwęca and lake Jeziorak. It can accommodate small vessels up to 50 tonnes (49 long tons; 55 short tons) displacement. The difference in water levels approaches 100 metres (330 ft), and is overcome using locks and a system of inclined planes between lakes.

Today it is used mainly for recreational purposes. It is considered one of the most significant monuments related to the history of technology and was named one of the Seven Wonders of Poland. The canal was also named one of Poland's official national Historic Monuments (Pomnik historii), as designated January 28, 2011. Its listing is maintained by the National Heritage Board of Poland.

== History ==
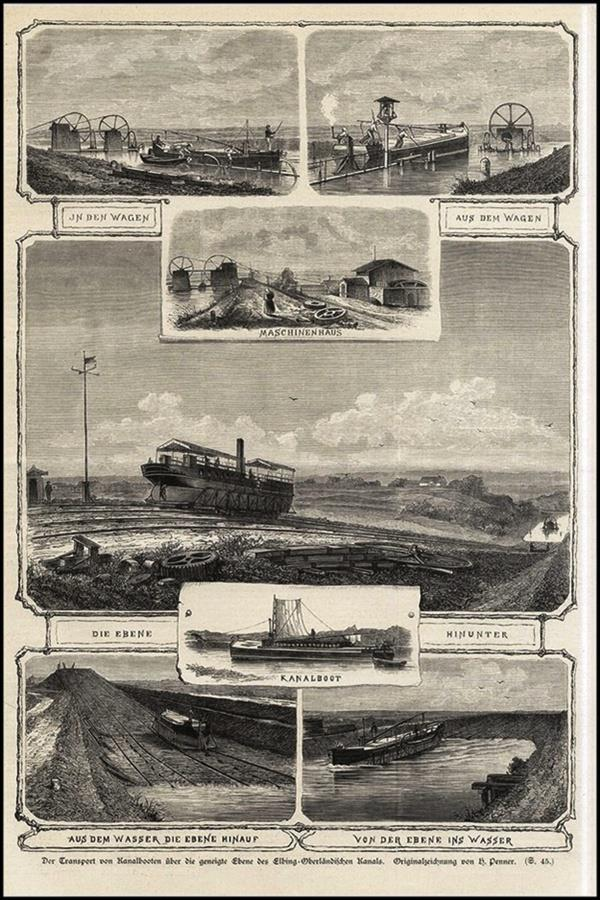
The canal, ca. 1880, by Hermann Penner

The canal is located in East Prussia and was designed between 1825 and 1844 by Georg Steenke, carrying out the commission awarded by the King of Prussia. Construction began in 1844. The difference in height over a 9.5-kilometre (5.9-mile) section of the route between the lakes was too great for building traditional locks; an ingenious system of inclined planes based on those used on the Morris Canal was employed instead, though the canal includes a few locks as well. There were originally four inclined planes, with a fifth added later, replacing five wooden locks. Built under the name Oberländischer Kanal (Upland Canal) and situated in the Kingdom of Prussia, it was opened on the 29 October 1860. Due to changes in national borders following World War II, the canal is in Poland. After wartime damage was repaired, it was restored to operation in 1948 and is now used for tourism. The canal underwent renovation between 2011 and 2015 and is now again open to navigation.

== The inclined planes ==
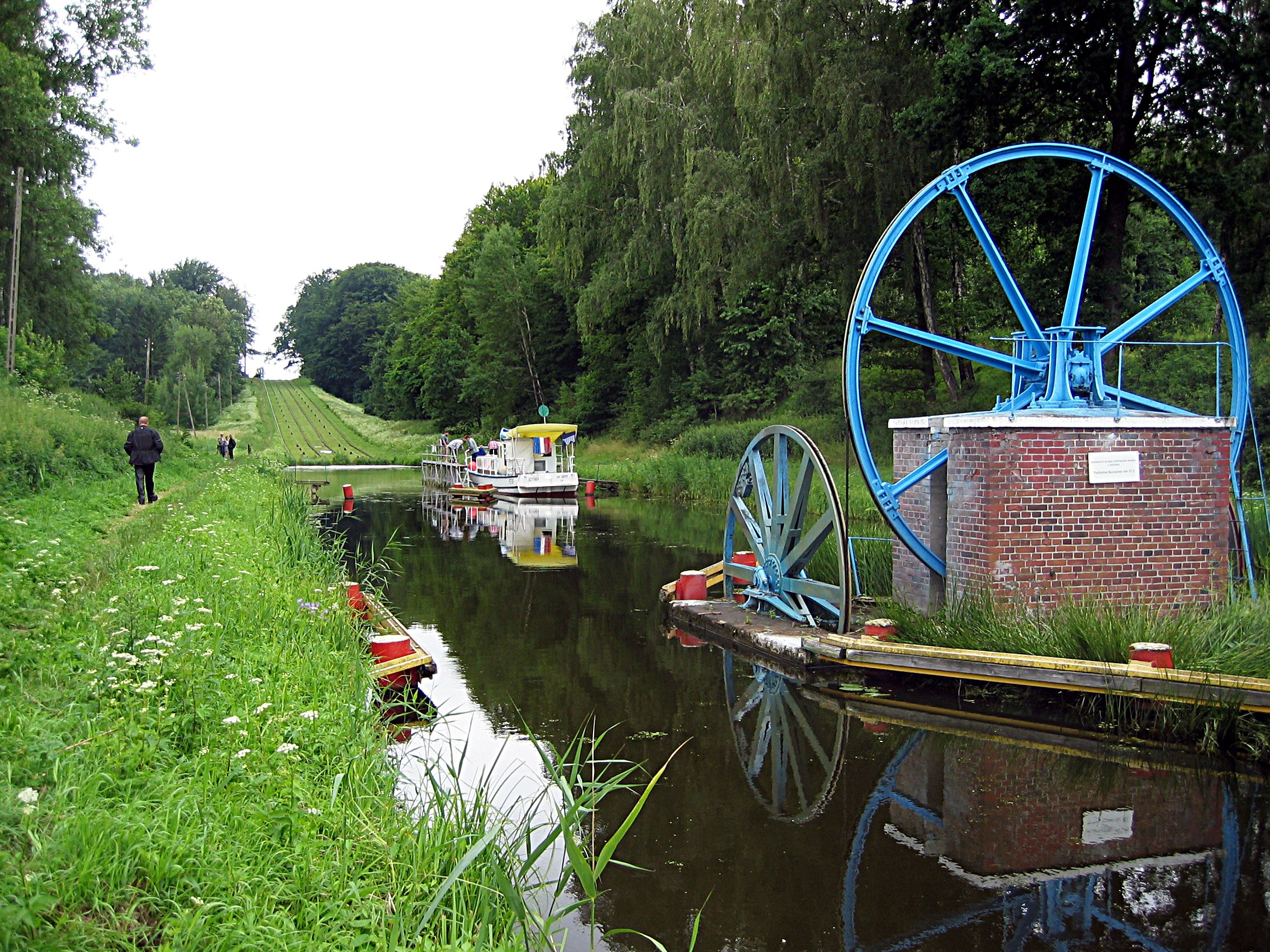
Elbląg Canal inclined plane

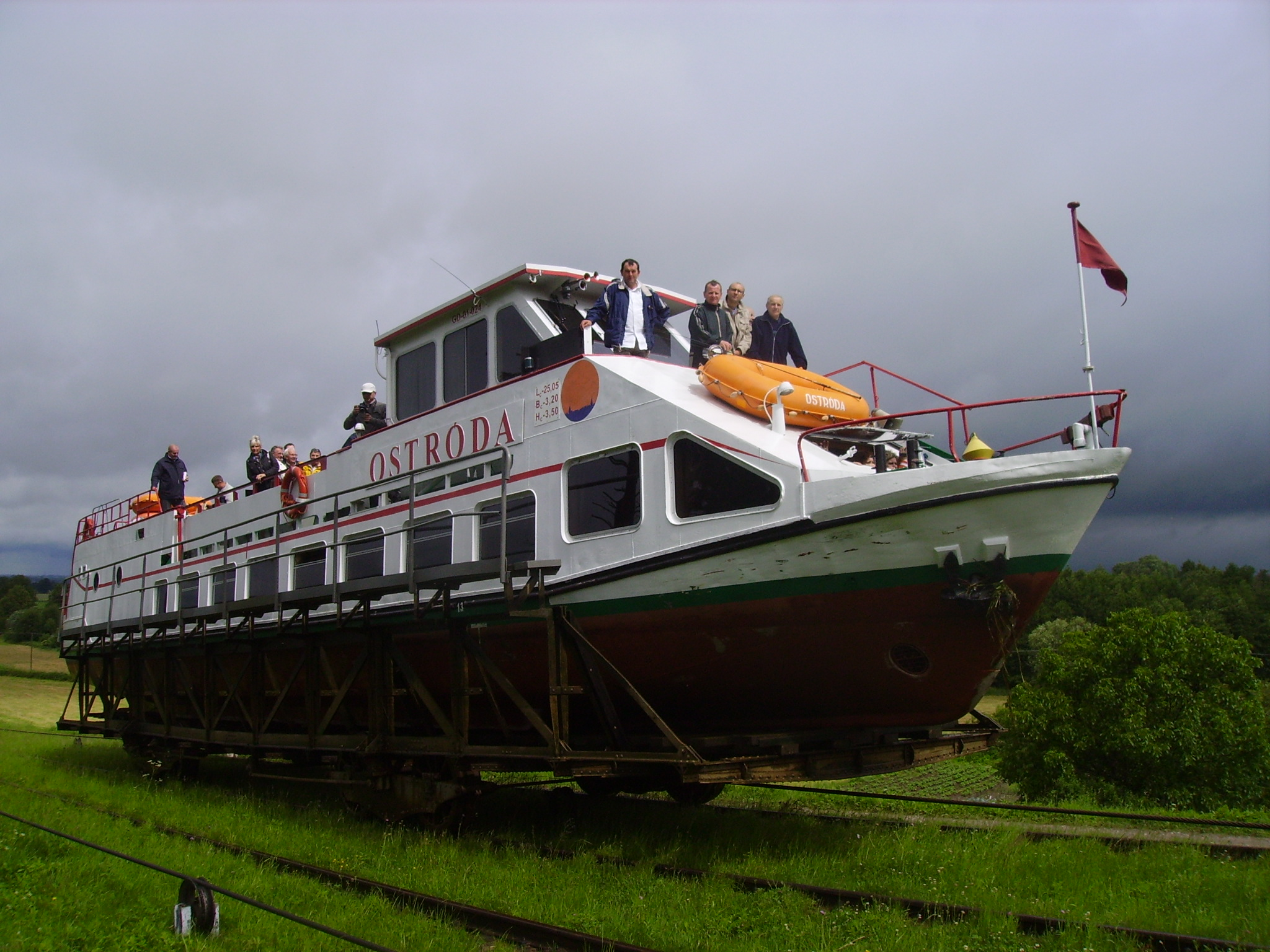
Ship "Ostróda" on crossing

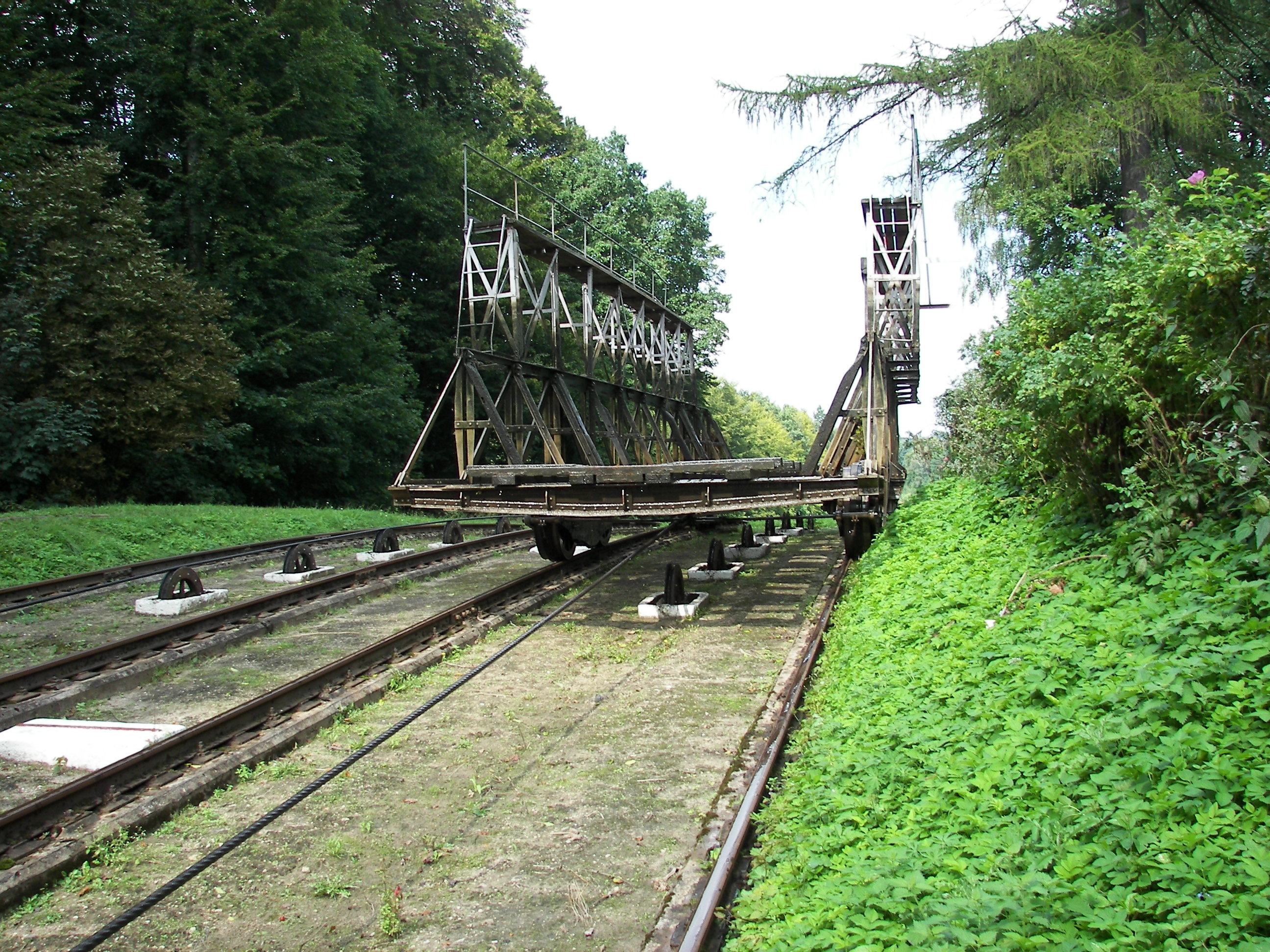
The inclined plane carriage in Buczyniec

The four original inclined planes are, in order from the summit level downwards, Buczyniec (Buchwalde) with a rise of 20.4 metres (67 ft) and a length of 224.8 metres (738 ft), Kąty (Kanthen) with a rise of 18.83 metres (61.8 ft) and a length of 225.97 metres (741.4 ft), Oleśnica (Schönfeld) with a rise of 21.97 metres (72.1 ft) and a length of 262.63 metres (861.6 ft), and Jelenie (Hirschfeld) with a rise of 21.97 metres (72.1 ft) and a length of 263.63 metres (864.9 ft). The fifth incline is Całuny Nowe (Neu-Kussfeld) with a rise of 13.72 metres (45.0 ft). It was built to replace five wooden locks close to Elbląg. They were constructed from 1860 to 1880.

The canal worked independently of other waterways and as a result the boats were designed within the limits of the inclines. The boats had a maximum length of 24.48 metres (80 ft 4 in), a maximum width of 2.98 metres (9 ft 9 in) and a maximum draught of 1.1 metres (3 ft 7 in); they carried loads of about 50 tonnes (49 long tons; 55 short tons).

The inclines all consist of two parallel rail tracks with a gauge of 3.27 metres (10 ft 8 3/4 in). Boats are carried on carriages that run on these rails. The inclines rise from the lower level of the canal to a summit and then down a second shorter incline to the upper canal level. The first part of the main incline and the short upper incline were both built at a gradient of 1:24 (4.2%). A carriage is lowered down the incline to counterbalance an upward moving carriage. Once the downward moving carriage has reached the summit and started down the main incline its weight helps pull up the upward moving carriage. This allowed the slope of the incline for this section to be built at a steeper gradient of 1:12 (8.3%).

== See also ==
- Augustów Canal, linking the river Vistula with the river Neman
- Big Chute Marine Railway also carries boats in an open carriage instead of a water filled caisson.
- Boat lift
- Lake Ruda Woda
- Ship lift of Krasnoyarsk hydroelectric power station
