= Jeziorak =

Lake in Poland

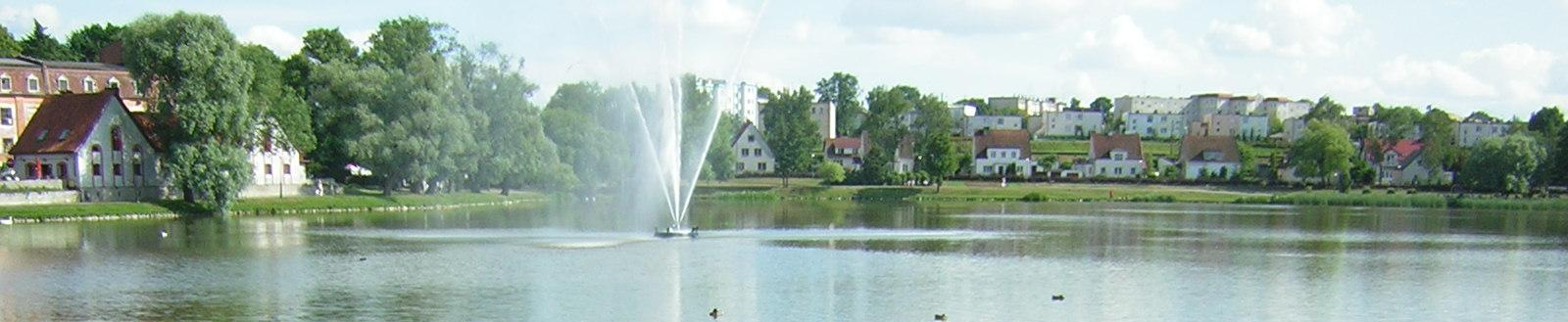
- View from Iława

- Location within Poland
- Location: Iława Lake District
- Coordinates: 53°42′58″N 19°38′44″E
- Primary outflows: Iławka
- Basin countries: Poland
- Max. length: 27.45 km (17.06 mi)
- Max. width: 2.4 km (1.5 mi)
- Surface area: 3,219 ha (7,950 acres)
- Max. depth: 13 m (43 ft)
- Islands: 20

Jeziorak (German: Geserichsee) is a lake in the Iława Lake District in Warmia-Masuria, Poland. Its area is 3,219 ha (including 20 islands with a combined area of 240 ha). It is 27.45 kilometres (17.06 mi) long and 2.4 kilometres (1.5 mi) across at its widest. The maximum depth is 13 metres (43 ft). It is the longest lake in Poland, and ranks 6th by area.

== Geology ==
The lake was formed by filling a glacial tunnel valley.

== Gallery ==
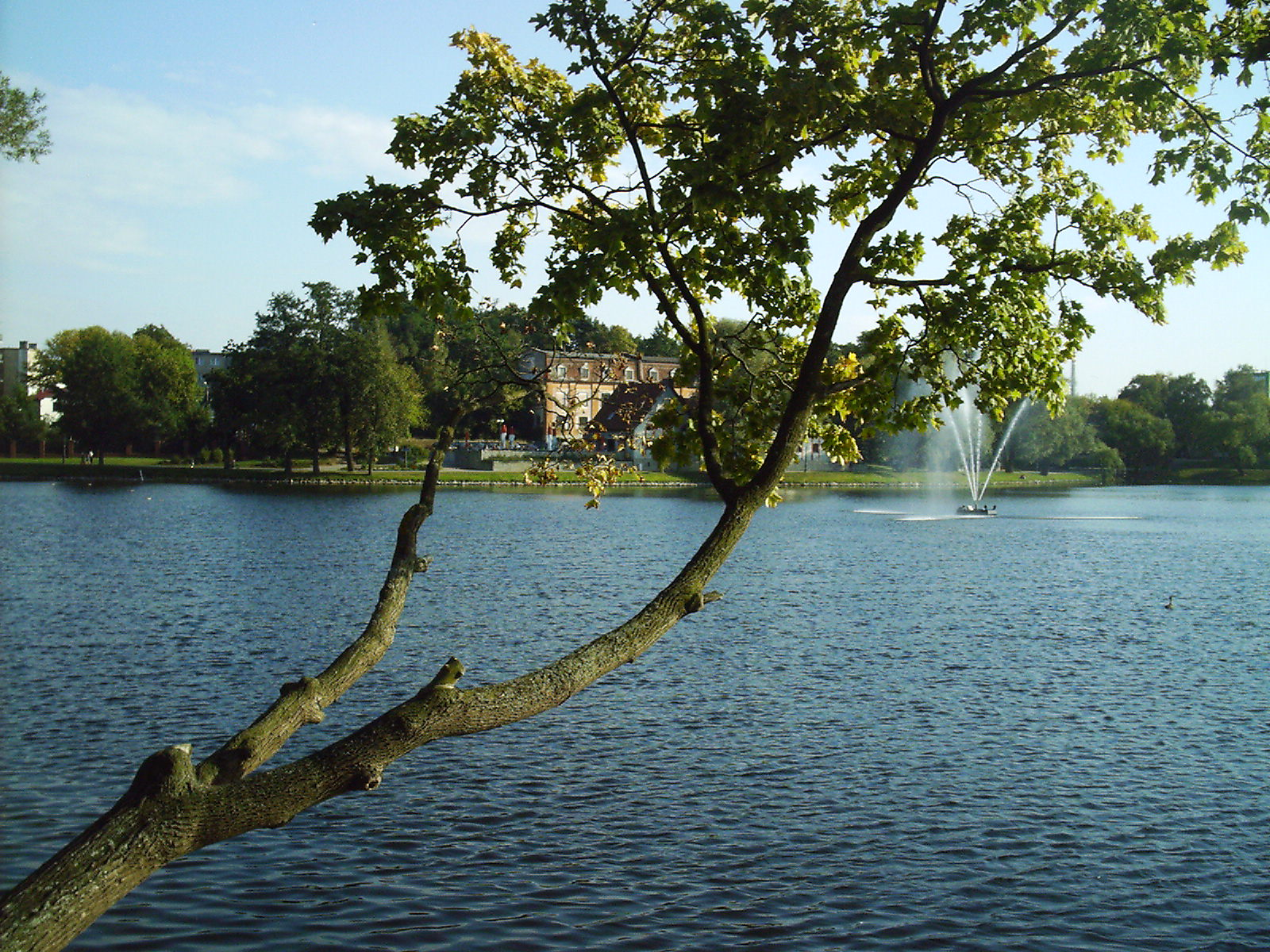
'Little' Jeziorak as seen from John Paul II Boulevard

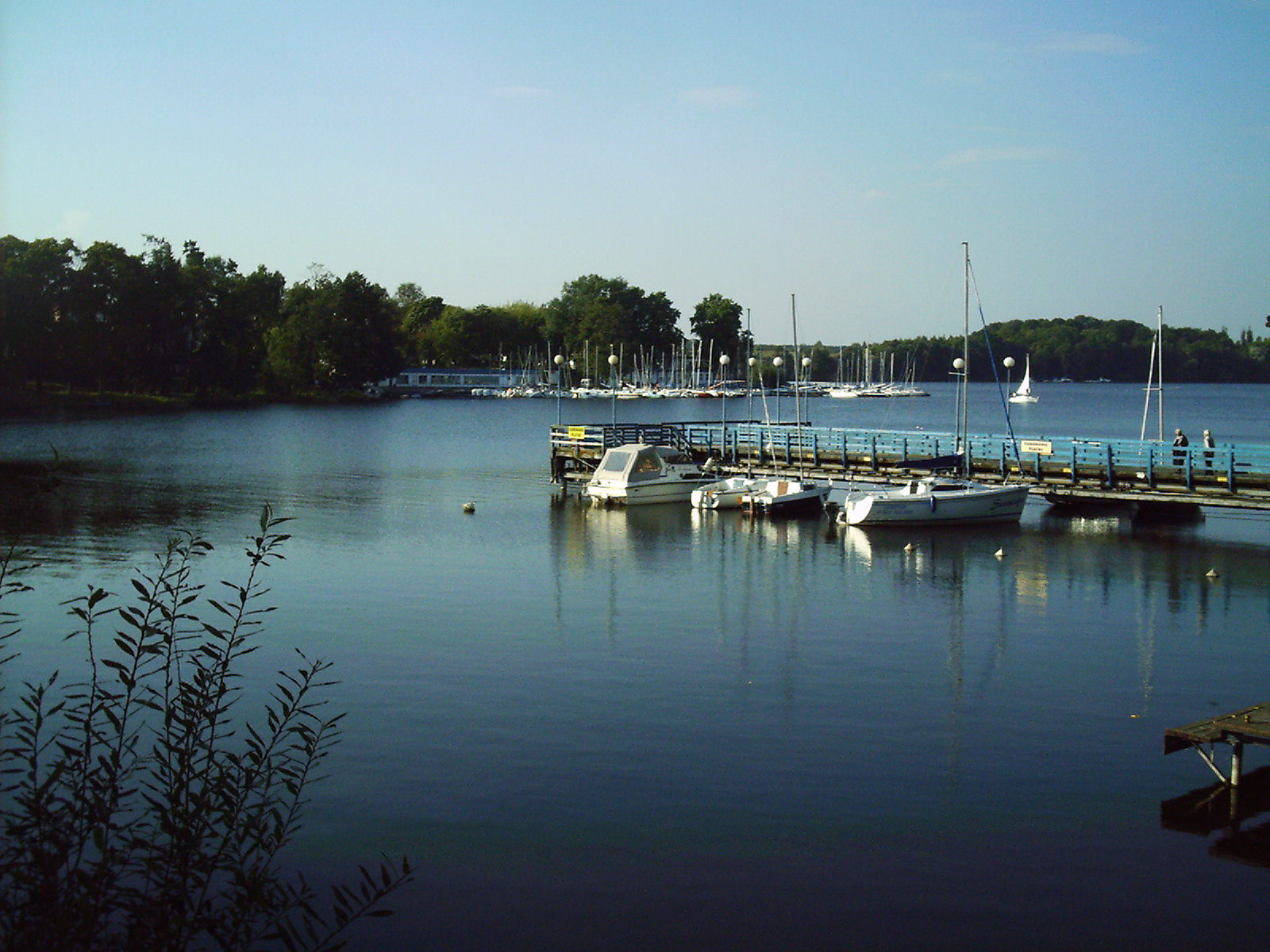
'Big' Jeziorak

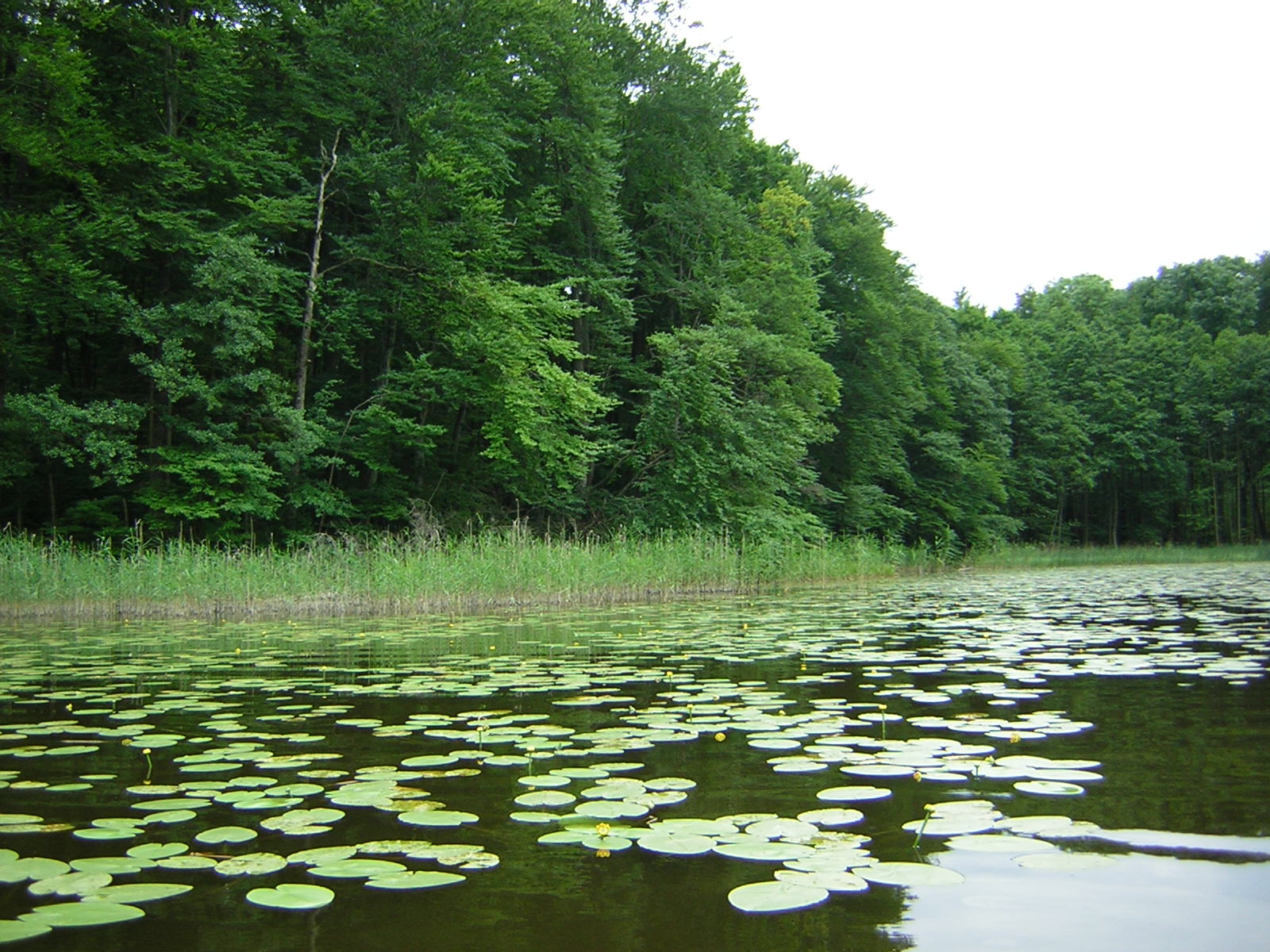
'Big' Jeziorak
