= Yablonovo =

Yablonovo (Russian: Яблоново) is the name of several inhabited localities in Russia.

Urban localities

- Yablonovo, Zabaykalsky Krai, an urban-type settlement in Chitinsky District of Zabaykalsky Krai

Rural localities

- Yablonovo, Chernyansky District, Belgorod Oblast, a khutor in Chernyansky District of Belgorod Oblast
- Yablonovo, Korochansky District, Belgorod Oblast, a selo in Korochansky District of Belgorod Oblast
- Yablonovo, Valuysky District, Belgorod Oblast, a selo in Yablonovsky Rural Okrug of Valuysky District of Belgorod Oblast
- Yablonovo, Komsomolsky District, Ivanovo Oblast, a village in Komsomolsky District of Ivanovo Oblast
- Yablonovo, Puchezhsky District, Ivanovo Oblast, a village in Puchezhsky District of Ivanovo Oblast
- Yablonovo, Savinsky District, Ivanovo Oblast, a village in Savinsky District of Ivanovo Oblast
- Yablonovo, Spas-Demensky District, Kaluga Oblast, a village in Spas-Demensky District of Kaluga Oblast
- Yablonovo, Tarussky District, Kaluga Oblast, a village in Tarussky District of Kaluga Oblast
- Yablonovo, Krasninsky District, Lipetsk Oblast, a selo in Yablonovsky Selsoviet of Krasninsky District of Lipetsk Oblast
- Yablonovo, Zadonsky District, Lipetsk Oblast, a selo in Yuryevsky Selsoviet of Zadonsky District of Lipetsk Oblast
- Yablonovo, Nizhny Novgorod Oblast, a village in Kuznetsovsky Selsoviet of Chkalovsky District of Nizhny Novgorod Oblast
- Yablonovo, Poddorsky District, Novgorod Oblast, a village in Poddorskoye Settlement of Poddorsky District of Novgorod Oblast
- Yablonovo, Starorussky District, Novgorod Oblast, a village in Novoselskoye Settlement of Starorussky District of Novgorod Oblast

== See also ==
- Jabłonowo (disambiguation), Polish spelling
- Jablonové (disambiguation), Slovak spelling
