= Zawady Małe =

- Settlement
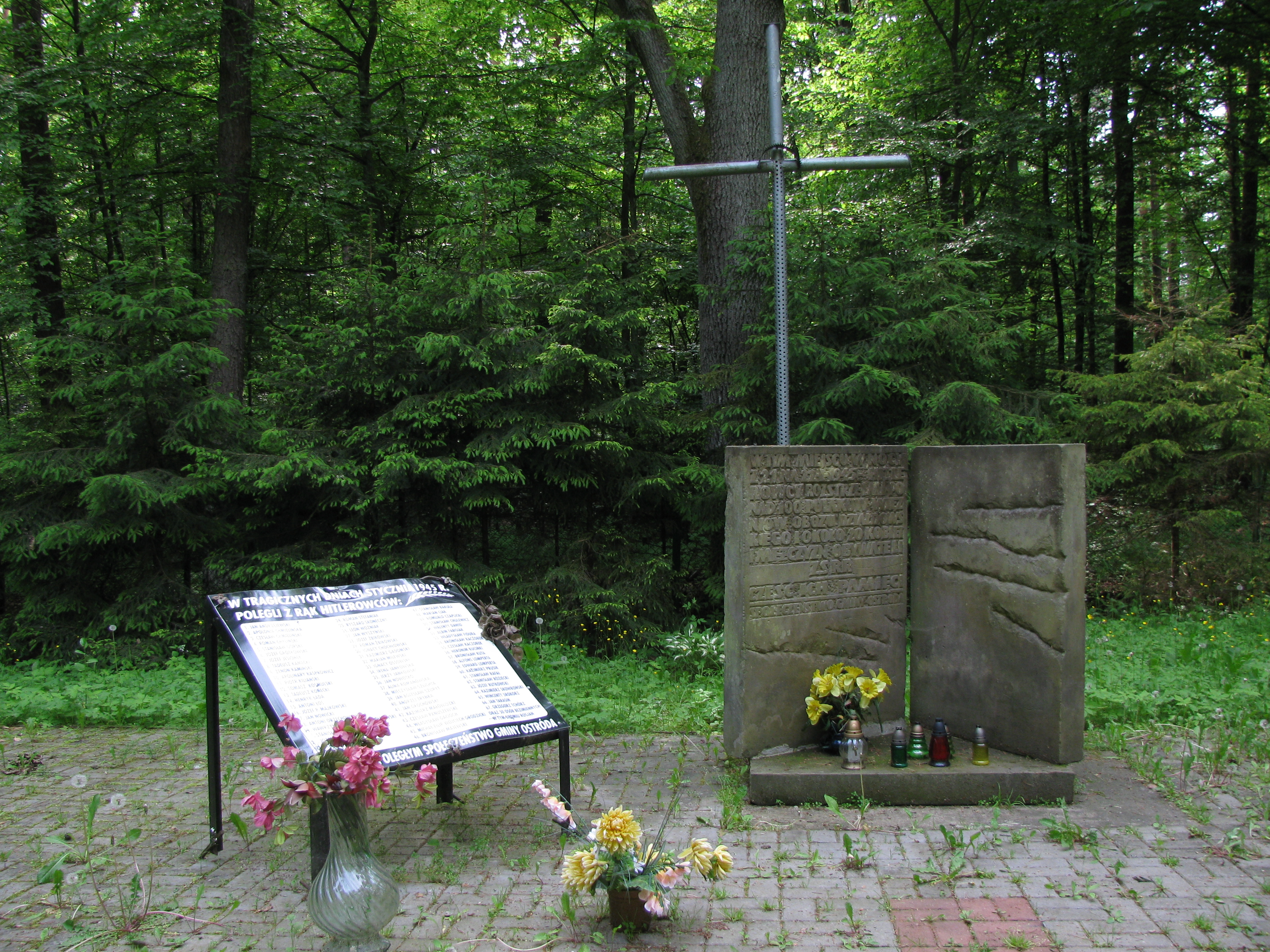
- Cemetery and memorial of victims of the German-perpetrated massacre from 1945

- Location within Poland
- Coordinates: 53°42′13″N 20°06′18″E
- Country: Poland
- Voivodeship: Warmian-Masurian
- County: Ostróda
- Gmina: Ostróda
- Time zone: UTC+1 (CET)
  - Summer (DST): UTC+2 (CEST)
- Vehicle registration: NOS

Zawady Małe ([zaˈvadɨ ˈmawɛ]; German: Königswiese) is a settlement, part of the village of Stare Jabłonki in the administrative district of Gmina Ostróda, within Ostróda County, Warmian-Masurian Voivodeship, in northern Poland.

During World War II, the settlement was the site of a massacre of 110 Poles and 7 Russians, committed by the Germans on January 21–22, 1945. There is a memorial at the site.
