= Lewald =

Lewald or Lewałd may refer to:

- Lewald (surname)
- Lewałd Wielki, a village in Poland
- Lawalde (Upper Sorbian: Lĕwałd), a municipality in Saxony, Germany
- Lewald Glacier in Antarctica
