= Lubajny =

- Village
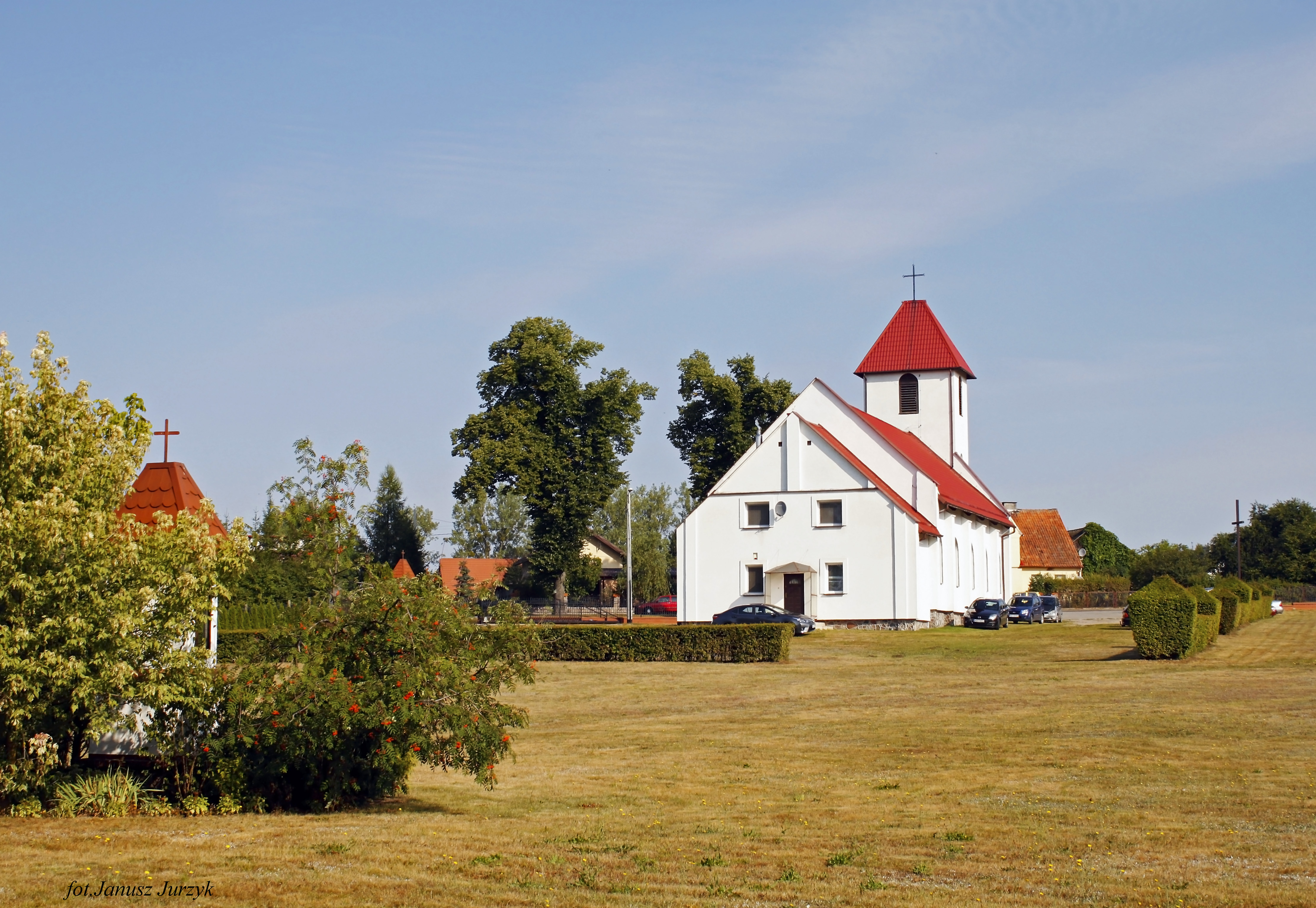
- Roman Catholic church of St. Benedict in Lubajny

- Location within Poland
- Coordinates: 53°42′00″N 20°01′14″E
- Country: Poland
- Voivodeship: Warmian-Masurian
- County: Ostróda
- Gmina: Ostróda

Lubajny ([luˈbai̯nɨ]; German: Lubainen) is a village in the administrative district of Gmina Ostróda, within Ostróda County, Warmian-Masurian Voivodeship, in northern Poland.
