= Komorowo, Ostróda County =

Komorowo
- Village
- Location within Poland
- Coordinates: 53°49′N 20°7′E
- Country: Poland
- Voivodeship: Warmian-Masurian
- County: Ostróda
- Gmina: Łukta
- Population (approx.): 190

Komorowo [kɔmɔˈrɔvɔ] is a village in the administrative district of Gmina Łukta, within Ostróda County, Warmian-Masurian Voivodeship, in northern Poland.
