= Jabłonka, Ostróda County =

Jabłonka
- Settlement
- Location within Poland
- Coordinates: 53°42′08″N 20°06′34″E
- Country: Poland
- Voivodeship: Warmian-Masurian
- County: Ostróda
- Gmina: Ostróda

Jabłonka ([jaˈbwɔnka]; German: Jablonken) is a settlement in the administrative district of Gmina Ostróda, within Ostróda County, Warmian-Masurian Voivodeship, in northern Poland.
