= Kojdy =

- City
- Location within Poland
- Coordinates: 53°52′N 20°9′E
- Country: Poland
- Voivodeship: Warmian-Masurian
- County: Ostróda
- Gmina: Łukta
- Population: 120

Kojdy [ˈkɔi̯dɨ] is a city in the administrative district of Gmina Łukta, within Ostróda County, Warmian-Masurian Voivodeship, in northern Poland.
