= Pietrzwałd, Warmian-Masurian Voivodeship =

Pietrzwałd
- Village
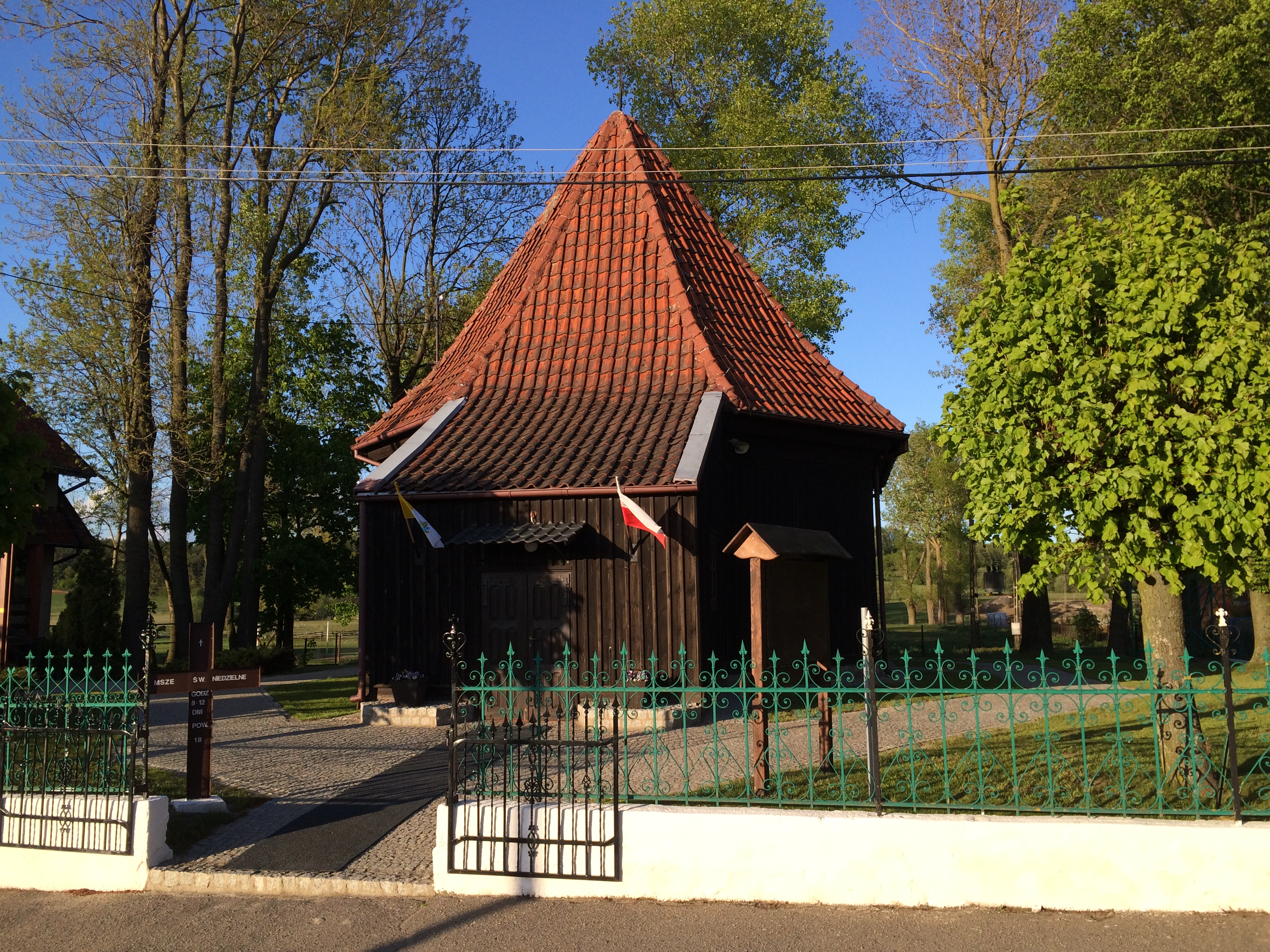
- Church of Saint Peter in chains

- Location within Poland
- Coordinates: 53°35′N 19°55′E
- Country: Poland
- Voivodeship: Warmian-Masurian
- County: Ostróda
- Gmina: Ostróda

Pietrzwałd [ˈpjɛtʂfau̯t] (German: Peterswalde) is a village in the administrative district of Gmina Ostróda, within Ostróda County, Warmian-Masurian Voivodeship, in northern Poland.
