= Gruda, Ostróda County =

Gruda
- Village
- Location within Poland
- Coordinates: 53°37′21″N 19°51′27″E
- Country: Poland
- Voivodeship: Warmian-Masurian
- County: Ostróda
- Gmina: Ostróda

Gruda ([ˈɡruda]; German: Annenhorst) is a village in the administrative district of Gmina Ostróda, within Ostróda County, Warmian-Masurian Voivodeship, in northern Poland.
