= Nowa Gierłoż =

- Settlement
- Location within Poland
- Coordinates: 53°37′44″N 19°47′13″E
- Country: Poland
- Voivodeship: Warmian-Masurian
- County: Ostróda
- Gmina: Ostróda

Nowa Gierłoż ([ˈnɔva ˈɡʲɛrwɔʂ]; German: Neu Görlitz) is a settlement in the administrative district of Gmina Ostróda, within Ostróda County, Warmian-Masurian Voivodeship, in northern Poland.
