= Worniny =

- Village
- Location within Poland
- Coordinates: 53°41′N 20°1′E
- Country: Poland
- Voivodeship: Warmian-Masurian
- County: Ostróda
- Gmina: Ostróda

Worniny ([vɔrˈninɨ]; German: Warneinen) is a village in the administrative district of Gmina Ostróda, within Ostróda County, Warmian-Masurian Voivodeship, in northern Poland.
