= Samin, Warmian-Masurian Voivodeship =

Samin
- Village
- Location within Poland
- Coordinates: 53°28′N 20°4′E
- Country: Poland
- Voivodeship: Warmian-Masurian
- County: Ostróda
- Gmina: Dąbrówno
- Population (2021): 476

Samin [ˈsamin] is a village in the administrative district of Gmina Dąbrówno, within Ostróda County, Warmian-Masurian Voivodeship, in northern Poland.
