= Wyżnice =

- Village
- Location within Poland
- Coordinates: 53°36′36″N 20°5′37″E
- Country: Poland
- Voivodeship: Warmian-Masurian
- County: Ostróda
- Gmina: Ostróda
- Population: 70

Wyżnice ([vɨʐˈnit͡sɛ]; German: Horst) is a village in the administrative district of Gmina Ostróda, within Ostróda County, Warmian-Masurian Voivodeship, in northern Poland.
