= Jakubowo, Ostróda County =

Jakubowo
- Village
- Location within Poland
- Coordinates: 53°24′24″N 20°02′58″E
- Country: Poland
- Voivodeship: Warmian-Masurian
- County: Ostróda
- Gmina: Dąbrówno

Jakubowo [jakuˈbɔvɔ] is a village in the administrative district of Gmina Dąbrówno, within Ostróda County, Warmian-Masurian Voivodeship, in northern Poland.
