= Bartki, Ostróda County =

Bartki
- Settlement
- Location within Poland
- Coordinates: 53°31′12″N 20°0′37″E
- Country: Poland
- Voivodeship: Warmian-Masurian
- County: Ostróda
- Gmina: Dąbrówno
- Elevation: 198 m (650 ft)
- Population: 40

Bartki [ˈbartki] is a settlement in the administrative district of Gmina Dąbrówno, within Ostróda County, Warmian-Masurian Voivodeship, in northern Poland.
