= Sarni =

Sarni may refer to:

- Sarni, India, a municipality in Madhya Pradesh
- Bill Sarni (1927–1983), a Major League Baseball catcher
- Stéphane Sarni (born 1980), a Swiss-Italian footballer

== See also ==
- Sarni Dół, a settlement in the Warmian-Masurian Voivodeship in northern Poland
- Sarni Dwór-Leśniczówka, a settlement in the Pomeranian Voivodeship in northern Poland
