= Buńki =

- Settlement
- Location within Poland
- Coordinates: 53°40′41″N 20°6′39″E
- Country: Poland
- Voivodeship: Warmian-Masurian
- County: Ostróda
- Gmina: Ostróda

Buńki ([ˈbuɲki]; German: Bunkenmühle) is a settlement in the administrative district of Gmina Ostróda, within Ostróda County, Warmian-Masurian Voivodeship, in northern Poland.
