= Czarny Róg, Ostróda County =

Czarny Róg
- Settlement
- Location within Poland
- Coordinates: 53°42′00″N 19°55′48″E
- Country: Poland
- Voivodeship: Warmian-Masurian
- County: Ostróda
- Gmina: Ostróda

Czarny Róg ([ˈt͡ʂarnɨ ˈruk]; German: Grünortspitze) is a settlement in the administrative district of Gmina Ostróda, within Ostróda County, Warmian-Masurian Voivodeship, in northern Poland.
