= Gąski, Ostróda County =

Gąski
- Settlement
- Location within Poland
- Coordinates: 53°40′39″N 20°07′37″E
- Country: Poland
- Voivodeship: Warmian-Masurian
- County: Ostróda
- Gmina: Ostróda

Gąski ([ˈɡɔ̃ski]; German: Gensken) is a settlement in the administrative district of Gmina Ostróda, within Ostróda County, Warmian-Masurian Voivodeship, in northern Poland.
