= Nowaczyzna =

- Village
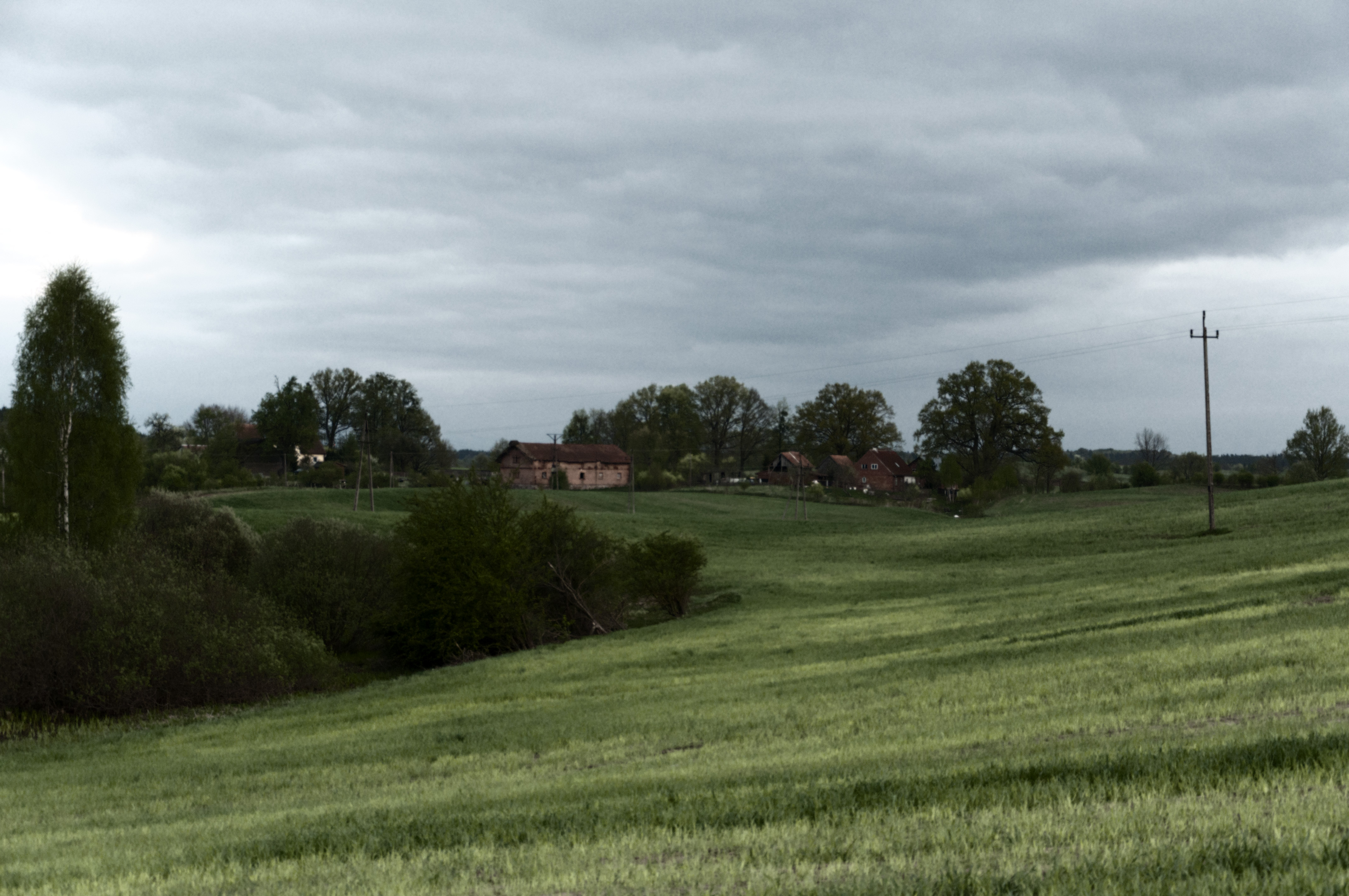
- The village as seen from the Swojki-Florczaki road

- Location within Poland
- Coordinates: 53°50′52″N 20°2′43″E
- Country: Poland
- Voivodeship: Warmian-Masurian
- County: Ostróda
- Gmina: Łukta
- Population: 60

Nowaczyzna ([nɔvaˈt͡ʂɨzna]) is a village in the administrative district of Gmina Łukta, within Ostróda County, Warmian-Masurian Voivodeship, in northern Poland.
