= Saminek =

- Village
- Location within Poland
- Coordinates: 53°29′N 20°4′E
- Country: Poland
- Voivodeship: Warmian-Masurian
- County: Ostróda
- Gmina: Dąbrówno
- Time zone: UTC+1 (CET)
  - Summer (DST): UTC+2 (CEST)
- Vehicle registration: NOS

Saminek [saˈminɛk] is a village in the administrative district of Gmina Dąbrówno, within Ostróda County, Warmian-Masurian Voivodeship, in northern Poland.

During World War II the German administration operated a forced labour subcamp of the Nazi prison in Barczewo in the village.
