= Młyn Idzbarski =

- Settlement
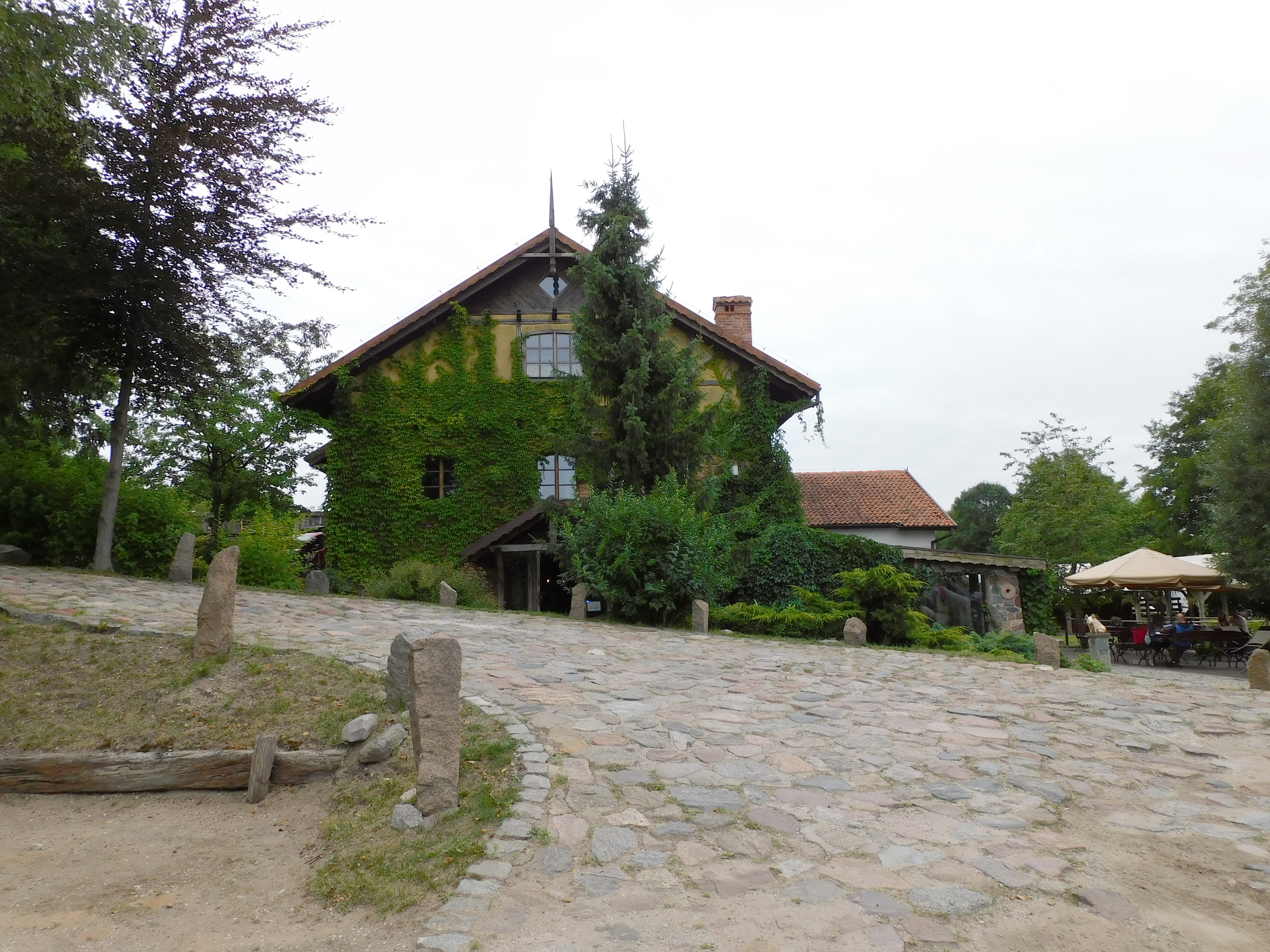

- Location within Poland
- Coordinates: 53°40′19″N 20°02′01″E
- Country: Poland
- Voivodeship: Warmian-Masurian
- County: Ostróda
- Gmina: Ostróda

Młyn Idzbarski ([ˈmwɨn id͡zˈbarski]; German: Hirschberg-Mühle) is a settlement in the administrative district of Gmina Ostróda, within Ostróda County, Warmian-Masurian Voivodeship, in northern Poland.
