= Wierzbica, Warmian-Masurian Voivodeship =

Wierzbica
- Village
- Location within Poland
- Coordinates: 53°28′44″N 19°58′51″E
- Country: Poland
- Voivodeship: Warmian-Masurian
- County: Ostróda
- Gmina: Dąbrówno
- Population: 360

Wierzbica [vjɛʐˈbit͡sa] is a village in the administrative district of Gmina Dąbrówno, within Ostróda County, Warmian-Masurian Voivodeship, in northern Poland.
