= Żurejny =

- Settlement
- Location within Poland
- Coordinates: 53°41′48″N 20°04′53″E
- Country: Poland
- Voivodeship: Warmian-Masurian
- County: Ostróda
- Gmina: Ostróda

Żurejny ([ʐuˈrɛi̯nɨ]; German: Szioreinen, 1938–1945 Schioreinen) is a settlement in the administrative district of Gmina Ostróda, within Ostróda County, Warmian-Masurian Voivodeship, in northern Poland.
