= Kątno, Warmian-Masurian Voivodeship =

Kątno
- Village
- Location within Poland
- Coordinates: 53°42′N 20°4′E
- Country: Poland
- Voivodeship: Warmian-Masurian
- County: Ostróda
- Gmina: Ostróda
- Population: 320

Kątno ([ˈkɔntnɔ]; German: Tafelbude) is a village in the administrative district of Gmina Ostróda, within Ostróda County, Warmian-Masurian Voivodeship, in northern Poland.
