= Dąg =

- Village
- Location within Poland
- Coordinates: 53°47′N 20°05′E
- Country: Poland
- Voivodeship: Warmian-Masurian
- County: Ostróda
- Gmina: Łukta
- Population: 220

Dąg [dɔnk] is a village in the administrative district of Gmina Łukta, within Ostróda County, Warmian-Masurian Voivodeship, in northern Poland.
