= Strzałkowo, Warmian-Masurian Voivodeship =

Strzałkowo
- Village
- Location within Poland
- Coordinates: 53°47′N 20°2′E
- Country: Poland
- Voivodeship: Warmian-Masurian
- County: Ostróda
- Gmina: Łukta

Strzałkowo [stʂau̯ˈkɔvɔ] is a village in the administrative district of Gmina Łukta, within Ostróda County, Warmian-Masurian Voivodeship, in northern Poland.
