= Wirwajdy =

- Village
- Location within Poland
- Coordinates: 53°40′N 19°52′E
- Country: Poland
- Voivodeship: Warmian-Masurian
- County: Ostróda
- Gmina: Ostróda

Wirwajdy ([virˈvai̯dɨ]; German: Warweiden) is a village in the administrative district of Gmina Ostróda, within Ostróda County, Warmian-Masurian Voivodeship, in northern Poland.
