= Czerwona Karczma =

- Settlement
- Location within Poland
- Coordinates: 53°43′39″N 19°56′43″E
- Country: Poland
- Voivodeship: Warmian-Masurian
- County: Ostróda
- Gmina: Ostróda

Czerwona Karczma ([t͡ʂɛrˈvɔna ˈkart͡ʂma]; German: Rothekrug) is a settlement in the administrative district of Gmina Ostróda, within Ostróda County, Warmian-Masurian Voivodeship, in northern Poland.
