= Wałdowo, Ostróda County =

Wałdowo
- Village
- Location within Poland
- Coordinates: 53°43′12″N 19°56′17″E
- Country: Poland
- Voivodeship: Warmian-Masurian
- County: Ostróda
- Gmina: Ostróda

Wałdowo ([vau̯ˈdɔvɔ]; German: Waldau) is a village in the administrative district of Gmina Ostróda, within Ostróda County, Warmian-Masurian Voivodeship, in northern Poland.

== Public transport ==
There are 3 public transport lines in the town operated by ZKM Ostróda. These are:

- 6 (Wałdowo - Grunwaldzka ZKM)
- 9 (Wałdowo - Nad Jarem)
- 12 (Wałdowo - Kajkowo)

The "Wałdowo" bus terminus is located near Kormorana Street, close to the administrative border of the city of Ostróda.
