= Miejska Wola, Ostróda County =

Miejska Wola
- Village
- Location within Poland
- Coordinates: 53°33′38″N 19°58′58″E
- Country: Poland
- Voivodeship: Warmian-Masurian
- County: Ostróda
- Gmina: Ostróda
- Number Zone: (+48) 89
- Vehicle registration: NOS

Miejska Wola ([ˈmjɛi̯ska ˈvɔla]; German: Steinfließ) is a village in the administrative district of Gmina Ostróda, within Ostróda County, Warmian-Masurian Voivodeship, in northern Poland.
