= Lipowiec, Ostróda County =

Lipowiec
- Village
- Location within Poland
- Coordinates: 53°40′10″N 20°00′58″E
- Country: Poland
- Voivodeship: Warmian-Masurian
- County: Ostróda
- Gmina: Ostróda

Lipowiec ([liˈpɔvjɛt͡s]; German: Lindenberg) is a village in the administrative district of Gmina Ostróda, within Ostróda County, Warmian-Masurian Voivodeship, in northern Poland.
