= Podlesie, Warmian-Masurian Voivodeship =

Podlesie
- Settlement
- Location within Poland
- Coordinates: 53°36′33″N 19°48′18″E
- Country: Poland
- Voivodeship: Warmian-Masurian
- County: Ostróda
- Gmina: Ostróda

Podlesie ([pɔdˈlɛɕɛ]; German: Julienhöh) is a settlement in the administrative district of Gmina Ostróda, within Ostróda County, Warmian-Masurian Voivodeship, in northern Poland.
