= Pląchawy =

- Village
- Location within Poland
- Coordinates: 53°31′51″N 19°59′28″E
- Country: Poland
- Voivodeship: Warmian-Masurian
- County: Ostróda
- Gmina: Dąbrówno

Pląchawy [plɔ̃ˈxavɨ] is a village in the administrative district of Gmina Dąbrówno, within Ostróda County, Warmian-Masurian Voivodeship, in northern Poland.
