= Szyldak =

- Village
- Location within Poland
- Coordinates: 53°37′12.7″N 20°3′52.4″E
- Country: Poland
- Voivodeship: Warmian-Masurian
- County: Ostróda
- Gmina: Ostróda
- Population: 610

Szyldak ([ˈʂɨldak]; German: Schildeck) is a village in the administrative district of Gmina Ostróda, within Ostróda County, Warmian-Masurian Voivodeship, in northern Poland.

== History ==
The history of the manor(Rittergut) begins in 1325 with the award of 400 Hufen of land to the knight Hans or Johannes Otatz in Gröben. Schildeck was probably founded ten years later in 1335. Around 1700 Johann von Schirstädt was the owner. He had a church built in the village of Schildeck in 1705.

The von Hardt family lived there from the 19th century until 1945. A member of this family was a judge in Osterode. At that time the manor covered 800 hectares (1977 acres) and included a dairy and a distillery. Horses were bred on the manor.

The population of the rural community (Landgemeinde) of Schildeck in 1905 was 242. There were 231 Protestants (the mother tongue of 22 was German and the mother tongue of 209 was Masurian), there were 7 Catholics whose mother tongue was Masurian, and 4 other Christians. The Protestant parishes for Schildeck were Kraplau and Döhringen. The Catholic parish was Osterode. The civil registry district (Standesamt) was Döhringen.

The population of Schildeck Manor (Gutsbezirk) in 1905 was 151. There were 149 Protestants (the mother tongue of 19 was German and the mother tongue of 130 was Masurian) and there were 2 Catholics (the mother tongue of 1 was German and the mother tongue of the other was Masurian). The Protestant parishes for Schildeck Manor were Kraplau and Döhringen. The Catholic parish was Osterode. The civil registry district (Standesamt) was Döhringen.

In January 1945 the Soviet Army occupied Schildeck. Soviet soldiers shot and killed the last owner of the manor, General Günther von Niebelschütz, on 26 January 1945. Von Niebelschütz had married Antonie Tosca "Elisabeth" Hardt (1879–1946), daughter of Eduard Louis "Arthur" (1847–1934) and "Sophie" Therese Ulrike (1854–1941) (von Wallenberg) Hardt, in 1919. Elisabeth was an heiress of the Hardt family, owners of the Manor.

== Monument ==
The manor house (Schloß Schildeck) (Pałac, Gdańska 8, 14-106 Szyldak, Poland, 53°37′18.5″N 20°3′58.2″E) was erected around 1910. It along with the park is in the Register of Monuments. Farm and livestock buildings are located in the northern part of the complex.

== Notable residents ==
- Günther von Niebelschütz (1882–1945) military officer, owner of the manor
- Oda Hardt-Rösler (1880–1965) artist
- Waldemar Rösler (1882–1916) painter
