= Dąbrowa, Ostróda County =

Dąbrowa
- Village
- Location within Poland
- Coordinates: 53°24′33″N 20°12′32″E
- Country: Poland
- Voivodeship: Warmian-Masurian
- County: Ostróda
- Gmina: Dąbrówno

Dąbrowa [dɔmˈbrɔva] is a village in the administrative district of Gmina Dąbrówno, within Ostróda County, Warmian-Masurian Voivodeship, in northern Poland.
