= Lesiak Ostródzki =

- Settlement
- Location within Poland
- Coordinates: 53°40′08″N 19°58′00″E
- Country: Poland
- Voivodeship: Warmian-Masurian
- County: Ostróda
- Gmina: Ostróda

Lesiak Ostródzki ([ˈlɛɕak ɔsˈtrut͡ski]; German: Leschaken, 1938–1945 Preußenwall) is a settlement in the administrative district of Gmina Ostróda, within Ostróda County, Warmian-Masurian Voivodeship, in northern Poland.
