= Nowy Folwark, Ostróda County =

Nowy Folwark
- Settlement
- Location within Poland
- Coordinates: 53°34′47″N 19°53′00″E
- Country: Poland
- Voivodeship: Warmian-Masurian
- County: Ostróda
- Gmina: Ostróda

Nowy Folwark ([ˈnɔvɨ ˈfɔlvark]; German: Luisenthal) is a settlement in the administrative district of Gmina Ostróda, within Ostróda County, Warmian-Masurian Voivodeship, in northern Poland.
