= Maronie =

Village in Poland

- Village
- Location within Poland
- Coordinates: 53°50′4″N 20°6′21″E
- Country: Poland
- Voivodeship: Warmian-Masurian
- County: Ostróda
- Gmina: Łukta

Maronie [maˈrɔɲɛ] is a village in the administrative district of Gmina Łukta, within Ostróda County, Warmian-Masurian Voivodeship, in northern Poland.
