= Naprom =

- Village
- Location within Poland
- Coordinates: 53°35′N 19°54′E
- Country: Poland
- Voivodeship: Warmian-Masurian
- County: Ostróda
- Gmina: Ostróda
- Population: 140

Naprom ([ˈnaprɔm]; German: Groß Nappern) is a village in the administrative district of Gmina Ostróda, within Ostróda County, Warmian-Masurian Voivodeship, in northern Poland.
