= Prusowo =

- Settlement
- Location within Poland
- Coordinates: 53°38′43″N 19°58′16″E
- Country: Poland
- Voivodeship: Warmian-Masurian
- County: Ostróda
- Gmina: Ostróda

Prusowo ([pruˈsɔvɔ]; German: Preußhof) is a settlement in the administrative district of Gmina Ostróda, within Ostróda County, Warmian-Masurian Voivodeship, in northern Poland.
