= Szafranki, Warmian-Masurian Voivodeship =

Szafranki
- Village
- Location within Poland
- Coordinates: 53°41′05″N 19°57′14″E
- Country: Poland
- Voivodeship: Warmian-Masurian
- County: Ostróda
- Gmina: Ostróda

Szafranki ([ʂaˈfranki]; German: Henriettenhof) is a village in the administrative district of Gmina Ostróda, within Ostróda County, Warmian-Masurian Voivodeship, in northern Poland.
