= Wygoda, Ostróda County =

Wygoda
- Village
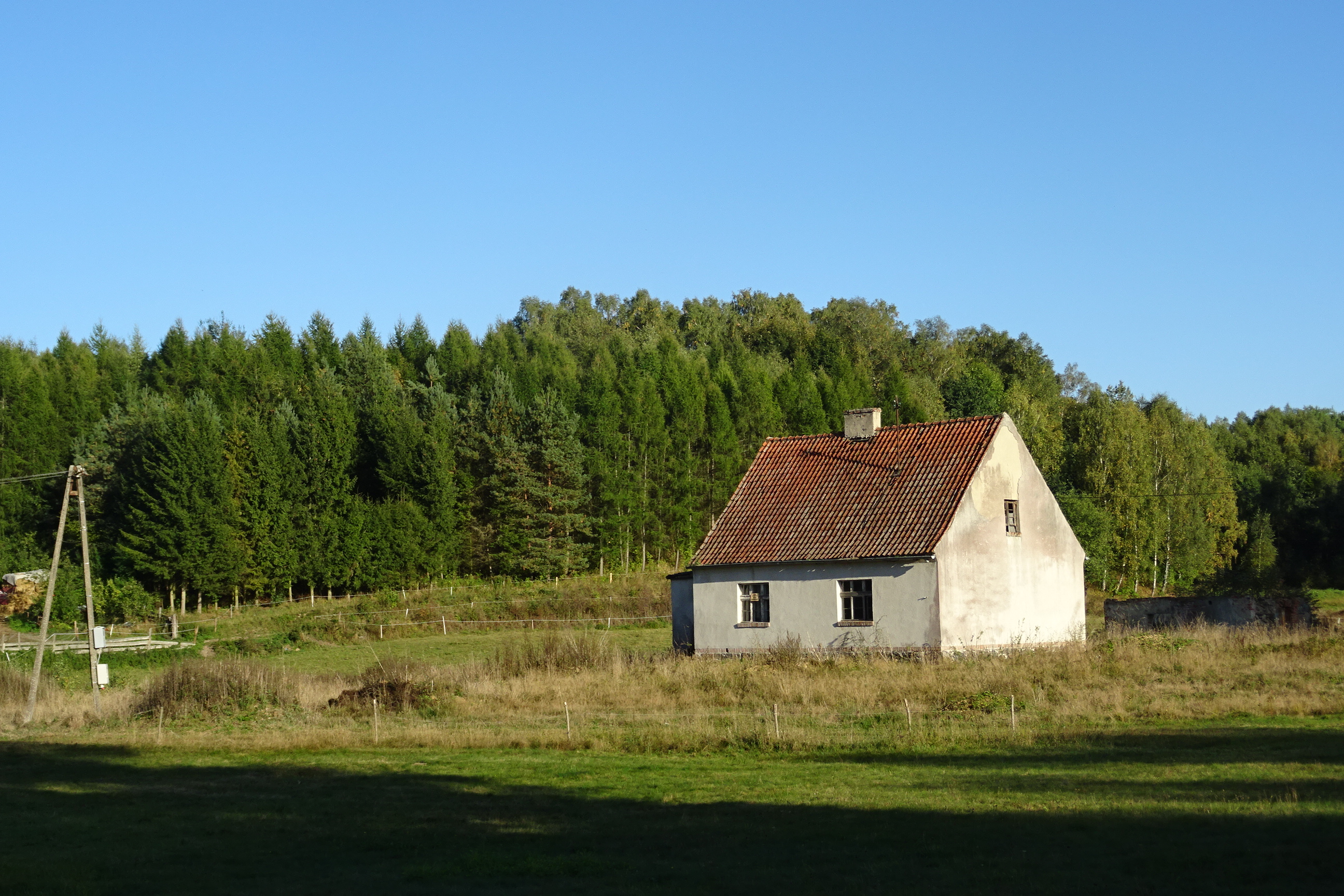

- Location within Poland
- Coordinates: 53°30′57″N 19°54′37″E
- Country: Poland
- Voivodeship: Warmian-Masurian
- County: Ostróda
- Gmina: Ostróda

Wygoda ([vɨˈɡɔda]; German: Ruhwalde) is a village in the administrative district of Gmina Ostróda, within Ostróda County, Warmian-Masurian Voivodeship, in northern Poland.
