= Reszki, Warmian-Masurian Voivodeship =

Reszki
- Village
- Location within Poland
- Coordinates: 53°37′N 19°50′E
- Country: Poland
- Voivodeship: Warmian-Masurian
- County: Ostróda
- Gmina: Ostróda

Reszki ([ˈrɛʂki]; German: Röschken) is a village in the administrative district of Gmina Ostróda, within Ostróda County, Warmian-Masurian Voivodeship, in northern Poland.
