= Zajączki, Ostróda County =

Zajączki
- Village
- Location within Poland
- Coordinates: 53°33′39″N 19°53′26″E
- Country: Poland
- Voivodeship: Warmian-Masurian
- County: Ostróda
- Gmina: Ostróda

Zajączki ([zaˈjɔnt͡ʂki]; German: Haasenberg) is a village in the administrative district of Gmina Ostróda, within Ostróda County, Warmian-Masurian Voivodeship, in northern Poland.
