= Białka, Gmina Łukta =

Białka
- Settlement
- Location within Poland
- Coordinates: 53°48′44″N 19°59′45″E
- Country: Poland
- Voivodeship: Warmian-Masurian
- County: Ostróda
- Gmina: Łukta

Białka [ˈbjau̯ka] is a settlement in the administrative district of Gmina Łukta, within Ostróda County, Warmian-Masurian Voivodeship, in northern Poland.
