= Ramoty, Warmian-Masurian Voivodeship =

Ramoty
- Village
- Location within Poland
- Coordinates: 53°49′N 20°5′E
- Country: Poland
- Voivodeship: Warmian-Masurian
- County: Ostróda
- Gmina: Łukta
- Population: 270

Ramoty [raˈmɔtɨ] is a village in the administrative district of Gmina Łukta, within Ostróda County, Warmian-Masurian Voivodeship, in northern Poland.
