= Idzbark =

- Village
- Location within Poland
- Coordinates: 53°41′N 20°3′E
- Country: Poland
- Voivodeship: Warmian-Masurian
- County: Ostróda
- Gmina: Ostróda
- Population (approx.): 500

Idzbark ([ˈid͡zbark]; German: Hirschberg) is a village in the administrative district of Gmina Ostróda, within Ostróda County, Warmian-Masurian Voivodeship, in northern Poland.
