= Giętlewo =

- Village
- Location within Poland
- Coordinates: 53°32′N 19°59′E
- Country: Poland
- Voivodeship: Warmian-Masurian
- County: Ostróda
- Gmina: Ostróda

Giętlewo ([ɡʲɛnˈtlɛvɔ]; German: Güntlau) is a village in the administrative district of Gmina Ostróda, within Ostróda County, Warmian-Masurian Voivodeship, in northern Poland.
