= Skwary, Warmian-Masurian Voivodeship =

Skwary
- Village
- Location within Poland
- Coordinates: 53°46′48″N 20°10′51″E
- Country: Poland
- Voivodeship: Warmian-Masurian
- County: Ostróda
- Gmina: Łukta

Skwary [ˈskfarɨ] is a village in the administrative district of Gmina Łukta, within Ostróda County, Warmian-Masurian Voivodeship, in northern Poland.
