= Mostkowo, Warmian-Masurian Voivodeship =

Mostkowo
- Village
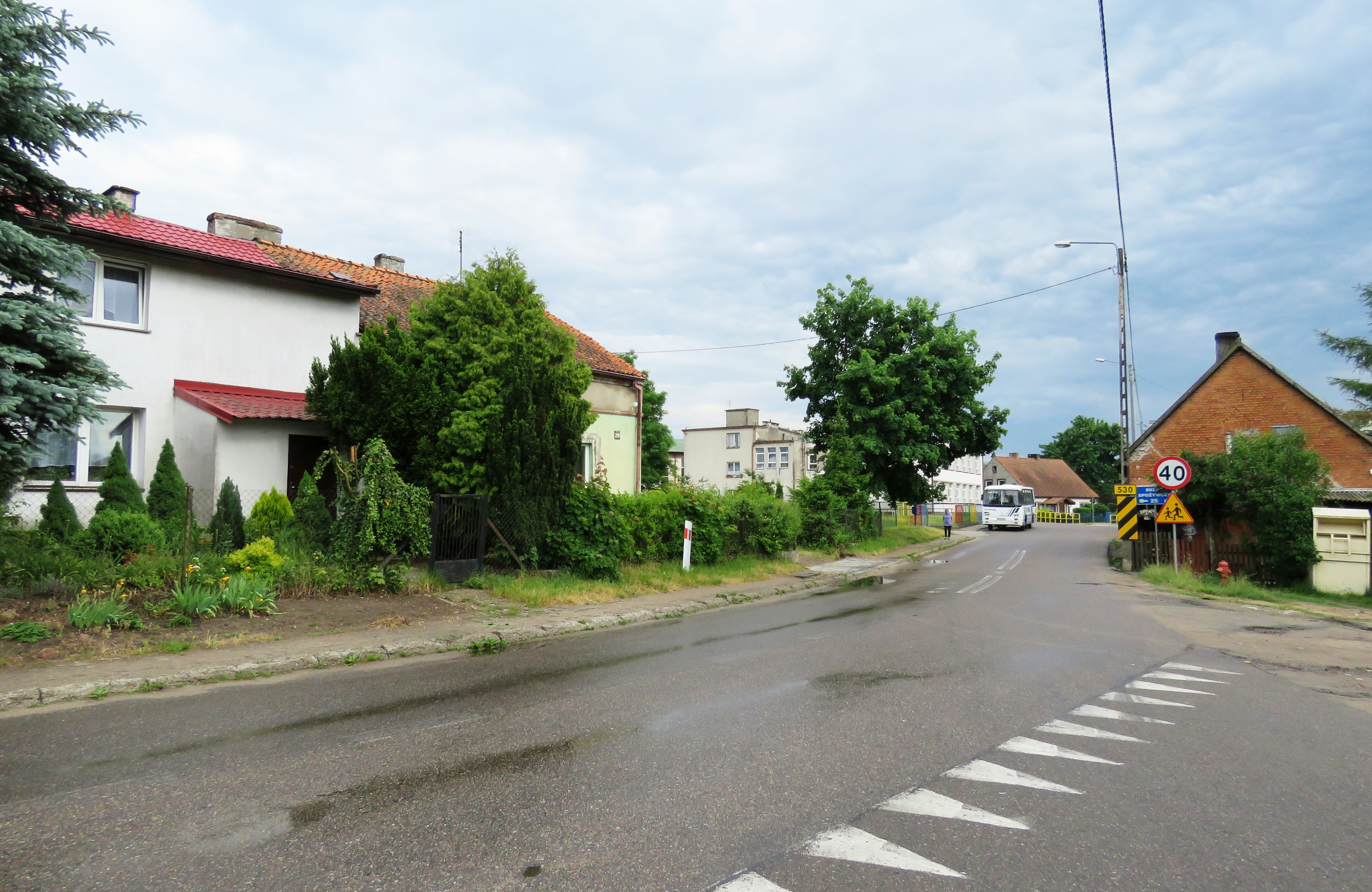

- Location within Poland
- Coordinates: 53°51′N 20°7′E
- Country: Poland
- Voivodeship: Warmian-Masurian
- County: Ostróda
- Gmina: Łukta
- Population: 570
- Time zone: UTC+1 (CET)
  - Summer (DST): UTC+2 (CEST)
- Vehicle registration: NOS

Mostkowo [mɔstˈkɔvɔ] is a village in the administrative district of Gmina Łukta, within Ostróda County, Warmian-Masurian Voivodeship, in northern Poland.

During World War II, in 1941, the German Nazi government operated a forced labour camp for women in the village.
