= Szklarnia, Ostróda County =

Szklarnia
- Settlement
- Location within Poland
- Coordinates: 53°42′13″N 20°05′52″E
- Country: Poland
- Voivodeship: Warmian-Masurian
- County: Ostróda
- Gmina: Ostróda

Szklarnia ([ˈʂklarɲa]; German: Luisenberg) is a settlement in the administrative district of Gmina Ostróda, within Ostróda County, Warmian-Masurian Voivodeship, in northern Poland.
