= Gierłoż =

Gierłoż may refer to the following places:

- Gierłoż, Kętrzyn County in Warmian-Masurian Voivodeship (north Poland). Wolf's Lair is located in the forest nearby.
- Gierłoż, Ostróda County in Warmian-Masurian Voivodeship (north Poland)
- Gierłoż Polska, Iława County, in Warmian-Masurian Voivodeship (north Poland)
