= Staszkowo =

- Village
- Location within Poland
- Coordinates: 53°41′7″N 20°6′18″E
- Country: Poland
- Voivodeship: Warmian-Masurian
- County: Ostróda
- Gmina: Ostróda
- Population: 200

Staszkowo ([staʂˈkɔvɔ]; German: Baarwiese) is a village in the administrative district of Gmina Ostróda, within Ostróda County, Warmian-Masurian Voivodeship, in northern Poland.
