= Ryn (disambiguation) =

Ryn is a town in Warmian-Masurian Voivodeship (north Poland)

Ryn may refer to the following places:

- Ryn, Ostróda County, a village in Warmian-Masurian Voivodeship (north Poland)
- Ryn, Greater Poland Voivodeship, a village in west-central Poland
- The Ryn Desert, in western Kazakhstan
- Ryn, a fictional Star Wars race

== See also ==
- RYN (disambiguation)
- Van Ryn, a Dutch surname (including a list of people with the name)
- Claes G. Ryn, Swedish-born American academic and educator
- Ryn Weaver, American singer
- Ryn Fisher, a fictional character in the Siren TV series
- Rynn
- Rhyn
