= Markuszewo =

- Settlement
- Location within Poland
- Coordinates: 53°47′25″N 20°1′47″E
- Country: Poland
- Voivodeship: Warmian-Masurian
- County: Ostróda
- Gmina: Łukta
- Population: 4

Markuszewo [markuˈʂɛvɔ] is a settlement in the administrative district of Gmina Łukta, within Ostróda County, Warmian-Masurian Voivodeship, in northern Poland.
