= Przylądek, Warmian-Masurian Voivodeship =

Settlement in Gmina Ostróda, Poland

Przylądek
- Settlement
- Location within Poland
- Coordinates: 53°41′38″N 19°55′09″E
- Country: Poland
- Voivodeship: Warmian-Masurian
- County: Ostróda
- Gmina: Ostróda

Przylądek [pʂɨˈlɔndɛk] is a settlement in the administrative district of Gmina Ostróda, within Ostróda County, Warmian-Masurian Voivodeship, in northern Poland.
