= Lesiak Lipowski =

- Settlement
- Location within Poland
- Coordinates: 53°35′56″N 19°49′07″E
- Country: Poland
- Voivodeship: Warmian-Masurian
- County: Ostróda
- Gmina: Ostróda

Lesiak Lipowski ([ˈlɛɕak liˈpɔfski]; German: Leschak bei Leip) is a settlement in the administrative district of Gmina Ostróda, within Ostróda County, Warmian-Masurian Voivodeship, in northern Poland.
