= Smykówko =

- Village
- Location within Poland
- Coordinates: 53°37′N 19°54′E
- Country: Poland
- Voivodeship: Warmian-Masurian
- County: Ostróda
- Gmina: Ostróda

Smykówko ([smɨˈkufkɔ]; German: Klein Schmückwalde) is a village in the administrative district of Gmina Ostróda, within Ostróda County, Warmian-Masurian Voivodeship, in northern Poland.

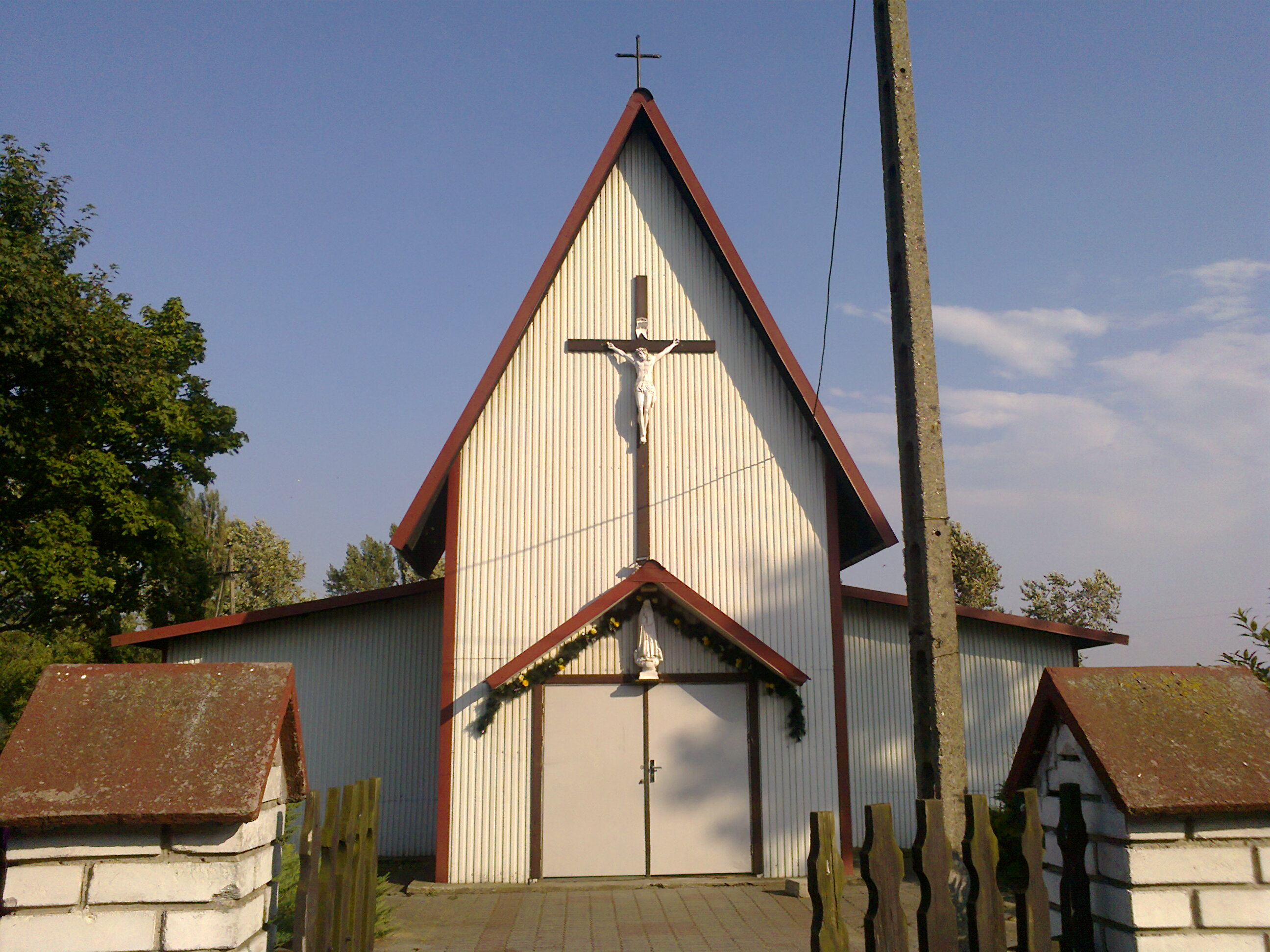
The church in Smykówko

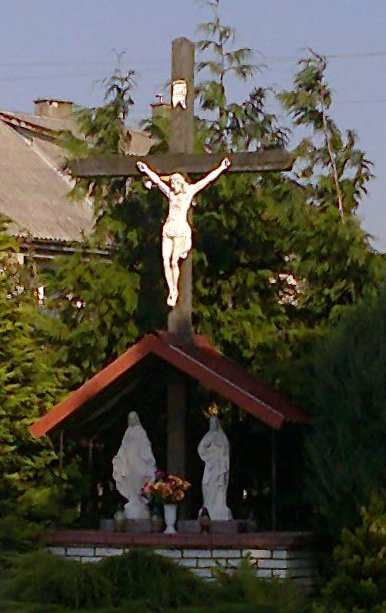
The chapel near church

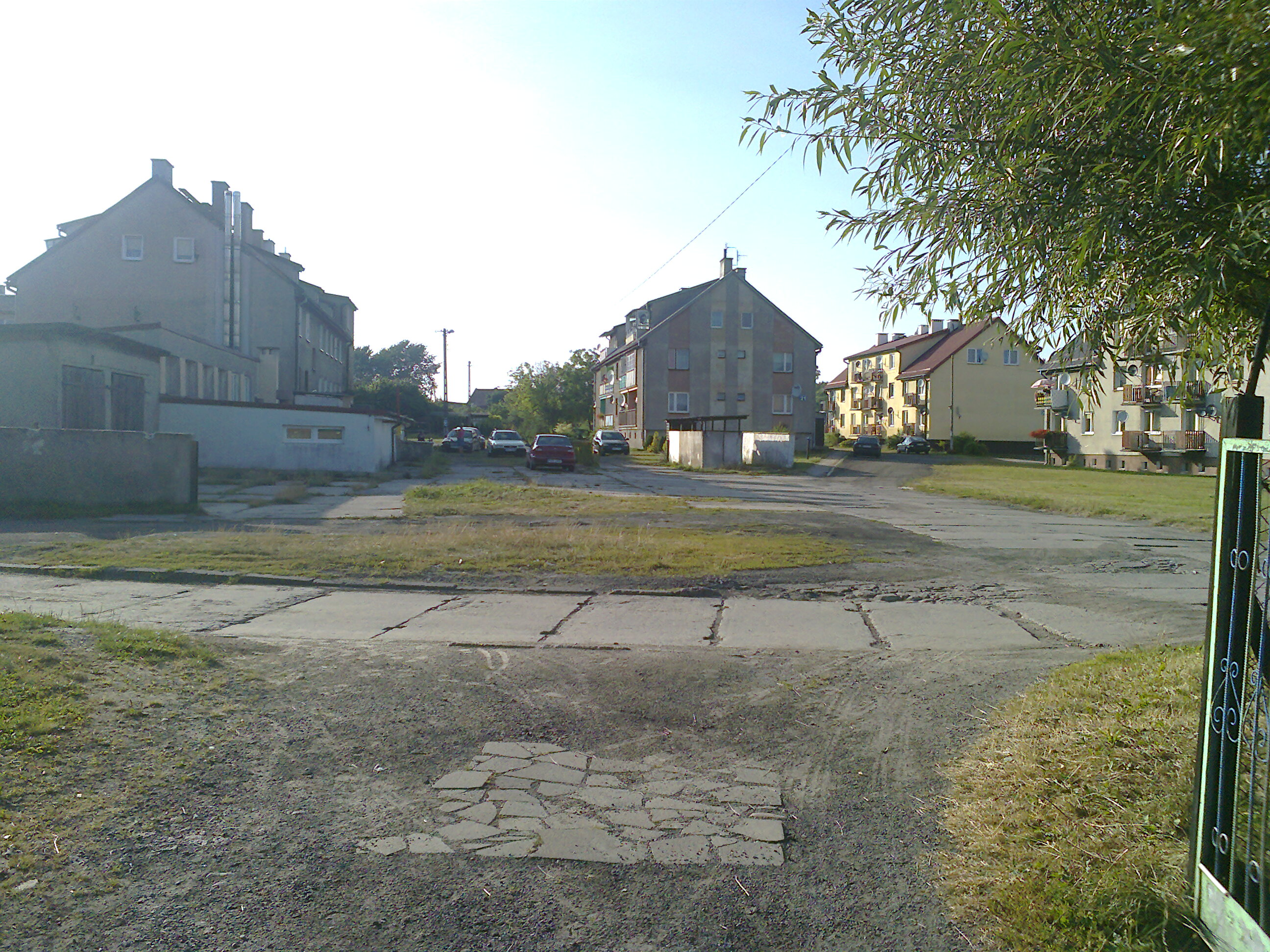
Residential in Smykówko
