= Swojki =

- Village
- Location within Poland
- Coordinates: 53°51′18″N 20°03′07″E
- Country: Poland
- Voivodeship: Warmian-Masurian
- County: Ostróda
- Gmina: Łukta

Swojki [ˈsfɔi̯ki] (German Schwoiken) is a village in the administrative district of Gmina Łukta, within Ostróda County, Warmian-Masurian Voivodeship, in northern Poland.
