= Bednarki =

- Village
- Location within Poland
- Coordinates: 53°34′30″N 19°58′55″E
- Country: Poland
- Voivodeship: Warmian-Masurian
- County: Ostróda
- Gmina: Ostróda
- Time zone: UTC+01:00 (CET)
  - Summer (DST): UTC+02:00 (CEST)

Bednarki ([bɛdˈnarki]; German: Bednarken) is a village in the administrative district of Gmina Ostróda, within Ostróda County, Warmian-Masurian Voivodeship, in northern Poland.
