= Marciniaki =

- Village
- Location within Poland
- Coordinates: 53°41′26″N 20°0′59″E
- Country: Poland
- Voivodeship: Warmian-Masurian
- County: Ostróda
- Gmina: Ostróda
- Population: 20

Marciniaki ([mart͡ɕiˈɲaki]; German: Martenshöh) is a village in the administrative district of Gmina Ostróda, within Ostróda County, Warmian-Masurian Voivodeship, in northern Poland.
