= Wólka Klonowska, Warmian-Masurian Voivodeship =

Wólka Klonowska
- Settlement
- Location within Poland
- Coordinates: 53°31′54″N 19°55′44″E
- Country: Poland
- Voivodeship: Warmian-Masurian
- County: Ostróda
- Gmina: Ostróda

Wólka Klonowska ([ˈvulka klɔˈnɔfska]; German: Georgenthal) is a settlement in the administrative district of Gmina Ostróda, within Ostróda County, Warmian-Masurian Voivodeship, in northern Poland.
