= Samborowo =

- Village
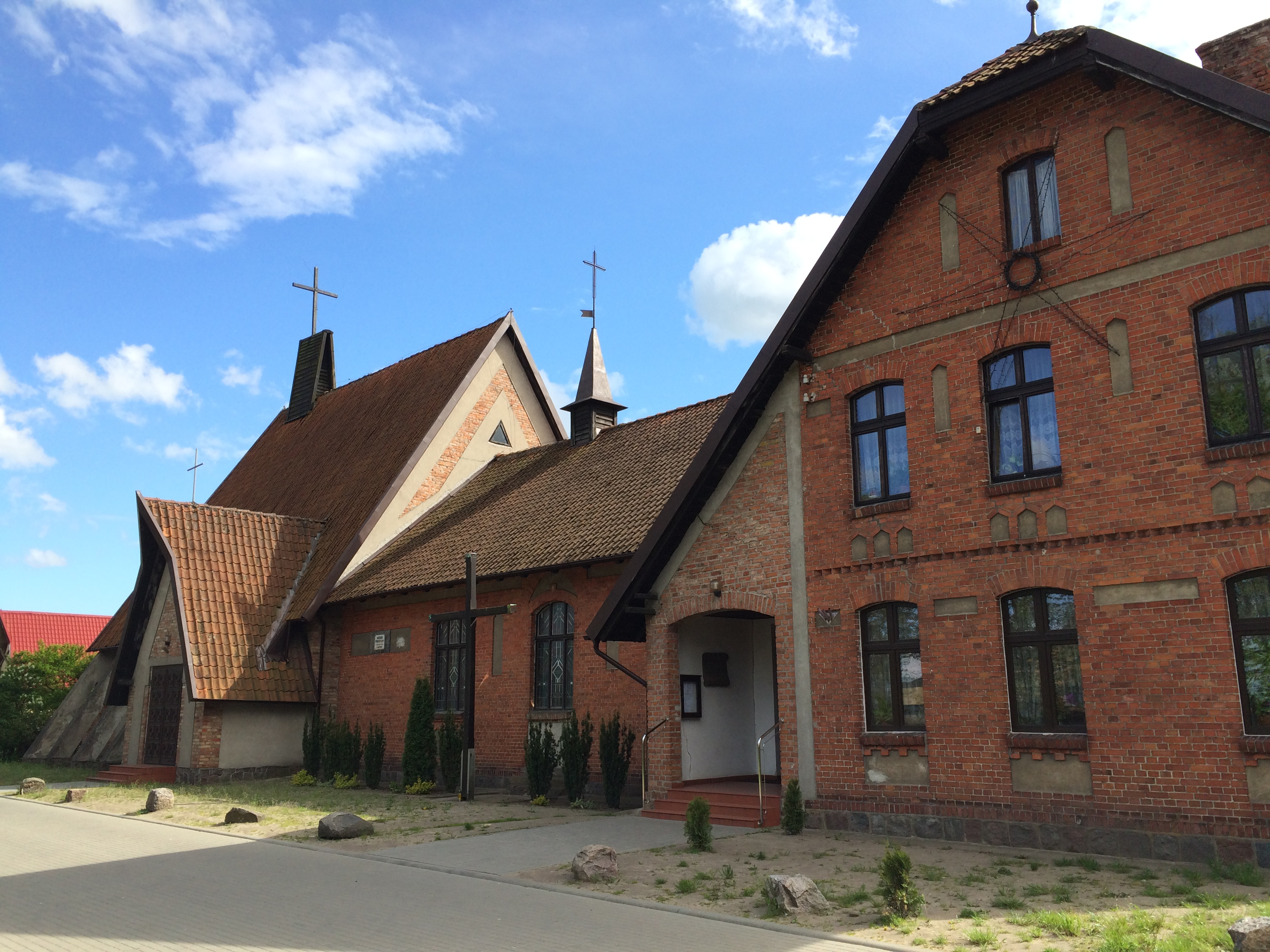
- Church of Saint Stanislaus

- Location within Poland
- Coordinates: 53°39′58″N 19°49′0″E
- Country: Poland
- Voivodeship: Warmian-Masurian
- County: Ostróda
- Gmina: Ostróda

Population
  - Total: 1,415
- Website: http://www.samborowo.pl

Samborowo [sambɔˈrɔvɔ] (German: Bergfriede) is a village in the administrative district of Gmina Ostróda, within Ostróda County, Warmian-Masurian Voivodeship, in northern Poland.
