= Zabłocie, Ostróda County =

Zabłocie
- Settlement
- Location within Poland
- Coordinates: 53°39′52″N 19°50′30″E
- Country: Poland
- Voivodeship: Warmian-Masurian
- County: Ostróda
- Gmina: Ostróda

Zabłocie ([zaˈbwɔt͡ɕɛ]; German: Katharinenhof) is a settlement in the administrative district of Gmina Ostróda, within Ostróda County, Warmian-Masurian Voivodeship, in northern Poland.
