= Zwierzewo =

- Village
- Location within Poland
- Coordinates: 53°43′N 20°3′E
- Country: Poland
- Voivodeship: Warmian-Masurian
- County: Ostróda
- Gmina: Ostróda

Zwierzewo ([zvjɛˈʐɛvɔ]; German: Thierberg) is a village in the administrative district of Gmina Ostróda, within Ostróda County, Warmian-Masurian Voivodeship, in northern Poland.
