= Dylewo Hills Landscape Park =

Polish park

Coordinates: 53.5517°N 19.9639°E

- Park Krajobrazowy Wzgórz Dylewskich
- IUCN category V (protected landscape/seascape)
- Interactive map of Dylewo Hills Landscape Park
- Location: Warmian-Masurian Voivodeship
- Area: 74.84 km^{2} (28.90 sq mi)
- Established: 1994

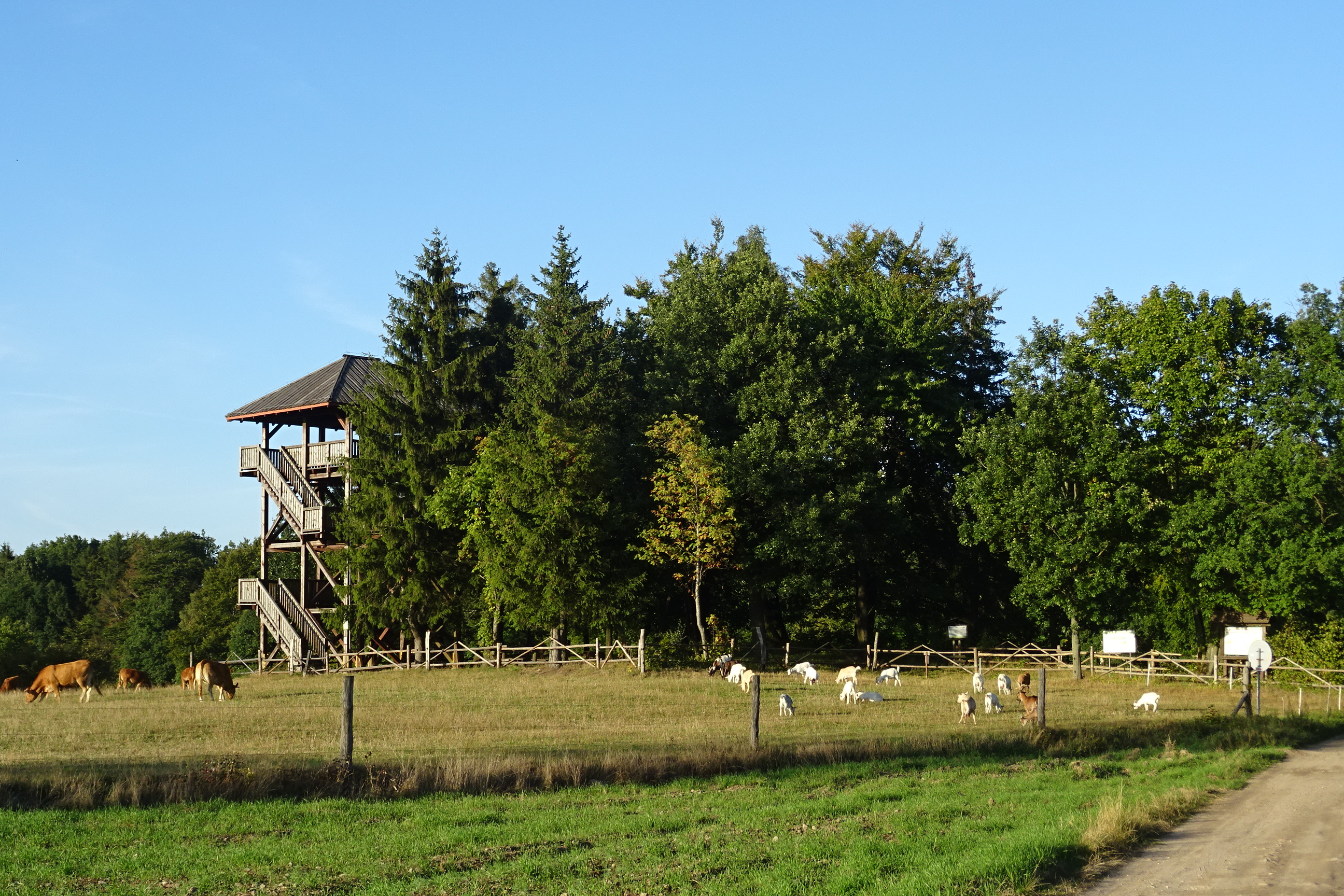
Dylewo Hills Landscape Park

Dylewo Hills Landscape Park (Park Krajobrazowy Wzgórz Dylewskich) is a protected area (Landscape Park) in northern Poland, established in 1994, covering an area of 74.84 square kilometres (28.90 sq mi).

The Park lies within Warmian-Masurian Voivodeship: in Iława County (Gmina Lubawa) and Ostróda County (Gmina Dąbrówno, Gmina Grunwald, Gmina Ostróda).

Within the Landscape Park are three nature reserves.

The area of the Dylewskie Hills is the only place in Warmia and Mazury where the mourning geranium, the violet and the forest illusion occur.
