= Czyżówka, Warmian-Masurian Voivodeship =

Czyżówka
- Settlement
- Location within Poland
- Coordinates: 53°40′04″N 19°50′50″E
- Country: Poland
- Voivodeship: Warmian-Masurian
- County: Ostróda
- Gmina: Ostróda

Czyżówka ([t͡ʂɨˈʐufka]; German: Schießgarten) is a settlement in the administrative district of Gmina Ostróda, within Ostróda County, Warmian-Masurian Voivodeship, in northern Poland.
