= Turznica, Warmian-Masurian Voivodeship =

Turznica
- Village
- Location within Poland
- Coordinates: 53°39′N 19°51′E
- Country: Poland
- Voivodeship: Warmian-Masurian
- County: Ostróda
- Gmina: Ostróda

Turznica ([tuʐˈnit͡sa]; German: Theuernitz) is a village in the administrative district of Gmina Ostróda, within Ostróda County, Warmian-Masurian Voivodeship, in northern Poland.
