= Nastajki =

- Village
- Location within Poland
- Coordinates: 53°38′25″N 19°52′51″E
- Country: Poland
- Voivodeship: Warmian-Masurian
- County: Ostróda
- Gmina: Ostróda

Nastajki ([nasˈtai̯ki]; German: Nasteiken) is a village in the administrative district of Gmina Ostróda, within Ostróda County, Warmian-Masurian Voivodeship, in northern Poland.
