= Ciemniak, Warmian-Masurian Voivodeship =

Ciemniak
- Settlement
- Location within Poland
- Coordinates: 53°38′05″N 19°46′56″E
- Country: Poland
- Voivodeship: Warmian-Masurian
- County: Ostróda
- Gmina: Ostróda
- Time zone: UTC+01:00 (CET)
  - Summer (DST): UTC+02:00 (CEST)

Ciemniak ([ˈt͡ɕɛmɲak]; German: Dunkelwalde) is a settlement in the administrative district of Gmina Ostróda, within Ostróda County, Warmian-Masurian Voivodeship, in northern Poland.
