= Wólka Lichtajńska =

- Settlement
- Location within Poland
- Coordinates: 53°40′10″N 20°00′57″E
- Country: Poland
- Voivodeship: Warmian-Masurian
- County: Ostróda
- Gmina: Ostróda

Wólka Lichtajńska ([ˈvulka lixˈtai̯ɲska]; German: Freiwalde) is a settlement in the administrative district of Gmina Ostróda, within Ostróda County, Warmian-Masurian Voivodeship, in northern Poland.
