= Kajkowo =

- Village
- Location within Poland
- Coordinates: 53°40′N 19°58′E
- Country: Poland
- Voivodeship: Warmian-Masurian
- County: Ostróda
- Gmina: Ostróda
- Population: 1,017

Kajkowo ([kai̯ˈkɔvɔ]; former Polish name: Bukwałd; German: Buchwalde) is a village in the administrative district of Gmina Ostróda, within Ostróda County, Warmian-Masurian Voivodeship, in northern Poland.
