= Spórka =

- Settlement
- Location within Poland
- Coordinates: 53°47′20″N 20°7′10″E
- Country: Poland
- Voivodeship: Warmian-Masurian
- County: Ostróda
- Gmina: Łukta

Spórka [ˈspurka] is a settlement in the administrative district of Gmina Łukta, within Ostróda County, Warmian-Masurian Voivodeship, in northern Poland.
