= Stare Miasto, Warmian-Masurian Voivodeship =

Stare Miasto
- Village
- Location within Poland
- Coordinates: 53°28′N 20°0′E
- Country: Poland
- Voivodeship: Warmian-Masurian
- County: Ostróda
- Gmina: Dąbrówno

Stare Miasto (Polish: [ˈstarɛ ˈmjastɔ]) is a village in the administrative district of Gmina Dąbrówno, within Ostróda County, Warmian-Masurian Voivodeship, in northern Poland.
