= Łogdowo =

- Village
- Location within Poland
- Coordinates: 53°28′N 20°9′E
- Country: Poland
- Voivodeship: Warmian-Masurian
- County: Ostróda
- Gmina: Dąbrówno

Łogdowo [wɔɡˈdɔvɔ] is a village in the administrative district of Gmina Dąbrówno, within Ostróda County, Warmian-Masurian Voivodeship, in northern Poland.

Łogdowo lies close to the site of the Battle of Grunwald (1410).
