= Szeląg, Warmian-Masurian Voivodeship =

Szeląg
- Settlement
- Location within Poland
- Coordinates: 53°46′12″N 19°57′8″E
- Country: Poland
- Voivodeship: Warmian-Masurian
- County: Ostróda
- Gmina: Łukta

Szeląg [ˈʂɛlɔnk] is a settlement in the administrative district of Gmina Łukta, within Ostróda County, Warmian-Masurian Voivodeship, in northern Poland.
