= Wysoka Wieś, Warmian-Masurian Voivodeship =

Wysoka Wieś
- Village
- Location within Poland
- Coordinates: 53°33′N 19°57′E
- Country: Poland
- Voivodeship: Warmian-Masurian
- County: Ostróda
- Gmina: Ostróda

Wysoka Wieś ([vɨˈsɔka ˈvjɛɕ]; German: Kernsdorf) is a village in the administrative district of Gmina Ostróda, within Ostróda County, Warmian-Masurian Voivodeship, in northern Poland.
