= Nowe Ramoty =

- Village
- Location within Poland
- Coordinates: 53°49′38″N 20°3′31″E
- Country: Poland
- Voivodeship: Warmian-Masurian
- County: Ostróda
- Gmina: Łukta

Nowe Ramoty [ˈnɔvɛ raˈmɔtɨ] is a village in the administrative district of Gmina Łukta, within Ostróda County, Warmian-Masurian Voivodeship, in northern Poland.
