= Lichtajny, Ostróda County =

Lichtajny
- Village
- Location within Poland
- Coordinates: 53°39′12″N 20°00′09″E
- Country: Poland
- Voivodeship: Warmian-Masurian
- County: Ostróda
- Gmina: Ostróda

Lichtajny ([lixˈtai̯nɨ]; German: Lichteinen) is a village in the administrative district of Gmina Ostróda, within Ostróda County, Warmian-Masurian Voivodeship, in northern Poland.
