= Górka, Gmina Ostróda =

Górka
- Village
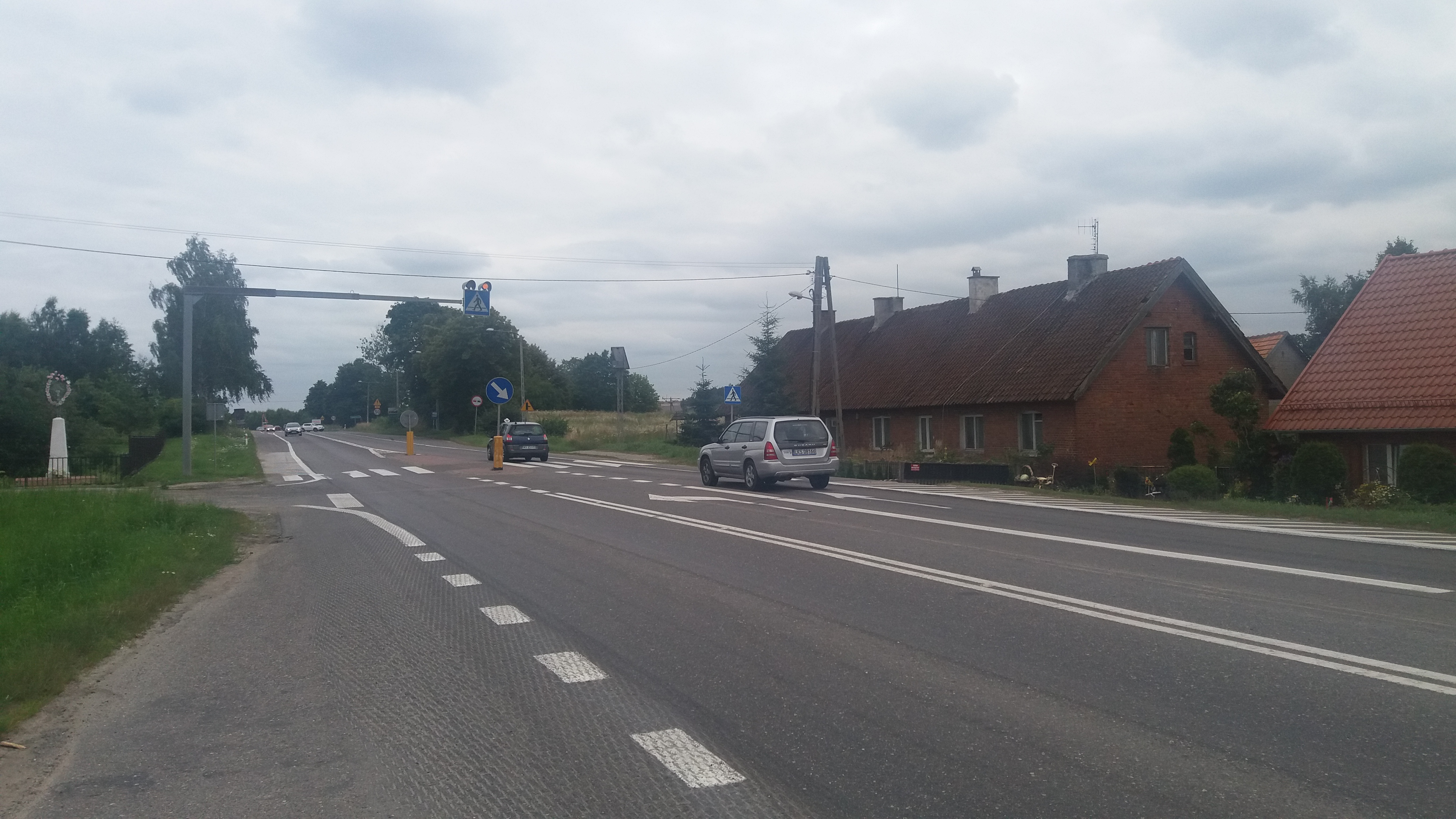

- Location within Poland
- Coordinates: 53°40′36″N 20°00′46″E
- Country: Poland
- Voivodeship: Warmian-Masurian
- County: Ostróda
- Gmina: Ostróda

Górka ([ˈɡurka]; German: Bergheim) is a village in the administrative district of Gmina Ostróda, within Ostróda County, Warmian-Masurian Voivodeship, in northern Poland.
