= Jabłonowo =

Jabłonowo may refer to:

- Jabłonowo, Międzychód County in Greater Poland Voivodeship (west-central Poland)
- Jabłonowo, Lublin Voivodeship (east Poland)
- Jabłonowo, Masovian Voivodeship (east-central Poland)
- Jabłonowo, Piła County in Greater Poland Voivodeship (west-central Poland)
- Jabłonowo, Działdowo County in Warmian-Masurian Voivodeship (north Poland)
- Jabłonowo, Olecko County in Warmian-Masurian Voivodeship (north Poland)
- Jabłonowo, Ostróda County in Warmian-Masurian Voivodeship (north Poland)
- Jabłonowo, Gryfice County in West Pomeranian Voivodeship (north-west Poland)
- Jabłonowo, Wałcz County in West Pomeranian Voivodeship (north-west Poland)

== See also ==
- Yablonovo Russian spelling
- Jablonové (disambiguation) Slovakian spelling
