= Międzylesie, Ostróda County =

Międzylesie
- Village
- Location within Poland
- Coordinates: 53°43′17″N 19°59′59″E
- Country: Poland
- Voivodeship: Warmian-Masurian
- County: Ostróda
- Gmina: Ostróda

Międzylesie ([mjɛnd͡zɨˈlɛɕɛ]; German: Abbau Thierberg) is a village in the administrative district of Gmina Ostróda, within Ostróda County, Warmian-Masurian Voivodeship, in northern Poland.
