= Dragolice =

- Village
- Location within Poland
- Coordinates: 53°48′22″N 20°3′5″E
- Country: Poland
- Voivodeship: Warmian-Masurian
- County: Ostróda
- Gmina: Łukta

Dragolice [draɡɔˈlit͡sɛ] is a village in the administrative district of Gmina Łukta, within Ostróda County, Warmian-Masurian Voivodeship, in northern Poland.
