= Samborówko =

- Settlement
- Location within Poland
- Coordinates: 53°39′26″N 19°49′24″E
- Country: Poland
- Voivodeship: Warmian-Masurian
- County: Ostróda
- Gmina: Ostróda

Samborówko ([sambɔˈrufkɔ]; German: Adlig Bergfriede) is a settlement in the administrative district of Gmina Ostróda, within Ostróda County, Warmian-Masurian Voivodeship, in northern Poland.
