= Ględy, Gmina Łukta =

Ględy
- Village
- Location within Poland
- Coordinates: 53°52′N 20°6′E
- Country: Poland
- Voivodeship: Warmian-Masurian
- County: Ostróda
- Gmina: Łukta
- Population: 260

Ględy [ˈɡlɛndɨ] is a village in the administrative district of Gmina Łukta, within Ostróda County, Warmian-Masurian Voivodeship, in northern Poland.
