= Fiugajki, Gmina Dąbrówno =

Fiugajki
- Village
- Location within Poland
- Coordinates: 53°29′N 20°2′E
- Country: Poland
- Voivodeship: Warmian-Masurian
- County: Ostróda
- Gmina: Dąbrówno

Fiugajki [fjuˈɡai̯ki] is a village in the administrative district of Gmina Dąbrówno, within Ostróda County, Warmian-Masurian Voivodeship, in northern Poland.
