= Brzydowo, Ostróda County =

Village in Gmina Ostróda, Poland

Brzydowo
- Village
- Location within Poland
- Coordinates: 53°38′02″N 19°57′20″E
- Country: Poland
- Voivodeship: Warmian-Masurian
- County: Ostróda
- Gmina: Ostróda
- Population: 510

Brzydowo ([bʐɨˈdɔvɔ]; German: Seubersdorf) is a village in the administrative district of Gmina Ostróda, within Ostróda County, Warmian-Masurian Voivodeship, in northern Poland.
