= Klonowo, Ostróda County =

Klonowo
- Village
- Location within Poland
- Coordinates: 53°31′6″N 19°56′55″E
- Country: Poland
- Voivodeship: Warmian-Masurian
- County: Ostróda
- Gmina: Ostróda
- Website: www.klonowo.pl

Klonowo ([klɔˈnɔvɔ]; German: Klonau) is a village in the administrative district of Gmina Ostróda, within Ostróda County, Warmian-Masurian Voivodeship, in northern Poland.
