= Lusajny =

- Village
- Location within Poland
- Coordinates: 53°51′50″N 20°9′6″E
- Country: Poland
- Voivodeship: Warmian-Masurian
- County: Ostróda
- Gmina: Łukta

Lusajny [luˈsai̯nɨ] is a village in the administrative district of Gmina Łukta, within Ostróda County, Warmian-Masurian Voivodeship, in northern Poland.
