= Pupki, Ostróda County =

Pupki
- Village
- Location within Poland
- Coordinates: 53°45′55″N 20°05′29″E
- Country: Poland
- Voivodeship: Warmian-Masurian
- County: Ostróda
- Gmina: Łukta

Pupki ([ˈpupki]; translation: Small Bottoms) is a village in the administrative district of Gmina Łukta, within Ostróda County, Warmian-Masurian Voivodeship, in northern Poland.
