= Nowe Siedlisko =

- Settlement
- Location within Poland
- Coordinates: 53°42′20″N 20°01′40″E
- Country: Poland
- Voivodeship: Warmian-Masurian
- County: Ostróda
- Gmina: Ostróda

Nowe Siedlisko ([ˈnɔvɛ ɕɛˈdliskɔ]; German: Neugut) is a settlement in the administrative district of Gmina Ostróda, within Ostróda County, Warmian-Masurian Voivodeship, in northern Poland.
