= Cibory, Ostróda County =

Cibory
- Settlement
- Location within Poland
- Coordinates: 53°39′38″N 19°58′55″E
- Country: Poland
- Voivodeship: Warmian-Masurian
- County: Ostróda
- Gmina: Ostróda

Cibory ([t͡ɕiˈbɔrɨ]; German: Lehmannsgut) is a settlement in the administrative district of Gmina Ostróda, within Ostróda County, Warmian-Masurian Voivodeship, in northern Poland.
