= Grabinek, Warmian-Masurian Voivodeship =

Grabinek
- Settlement
- Location within Poland
- Coordinates: 53°39′26″N 20°1′50″E
- Country: Poland
- Voivodeship: Warmian-Masurian
- County: Ostróda
- Gmina: Ostróda

Grabinek ([ɡraˈbinɛk]; German: Klein Gröben) is a settlement in the administrative district of Gmina Ostróda, within Ostróda County, Warmian-Masurian Voivodeship, in northern Poland.
