= Gardyny, Ostróda County =

Gardyny Gardienen
- Village
- Location within Poland
- Coordinates: 53°25′N 20°11′E
- Country: Poland
- Voivodeship: Warmian-Masurian
- County: Ostróda
- Gmina: Dąbrówno
- Population: 420

Gardyny [ɡarˈdɨnɨ] is a village in the administrative district of Gmina Dąbrówno, within Ostróda County, Warmian-Masurian Voivodeship, in northern Poland.
