= Leszcz, Warmian-Masurian Voivodeship =

Leszcz
- Village
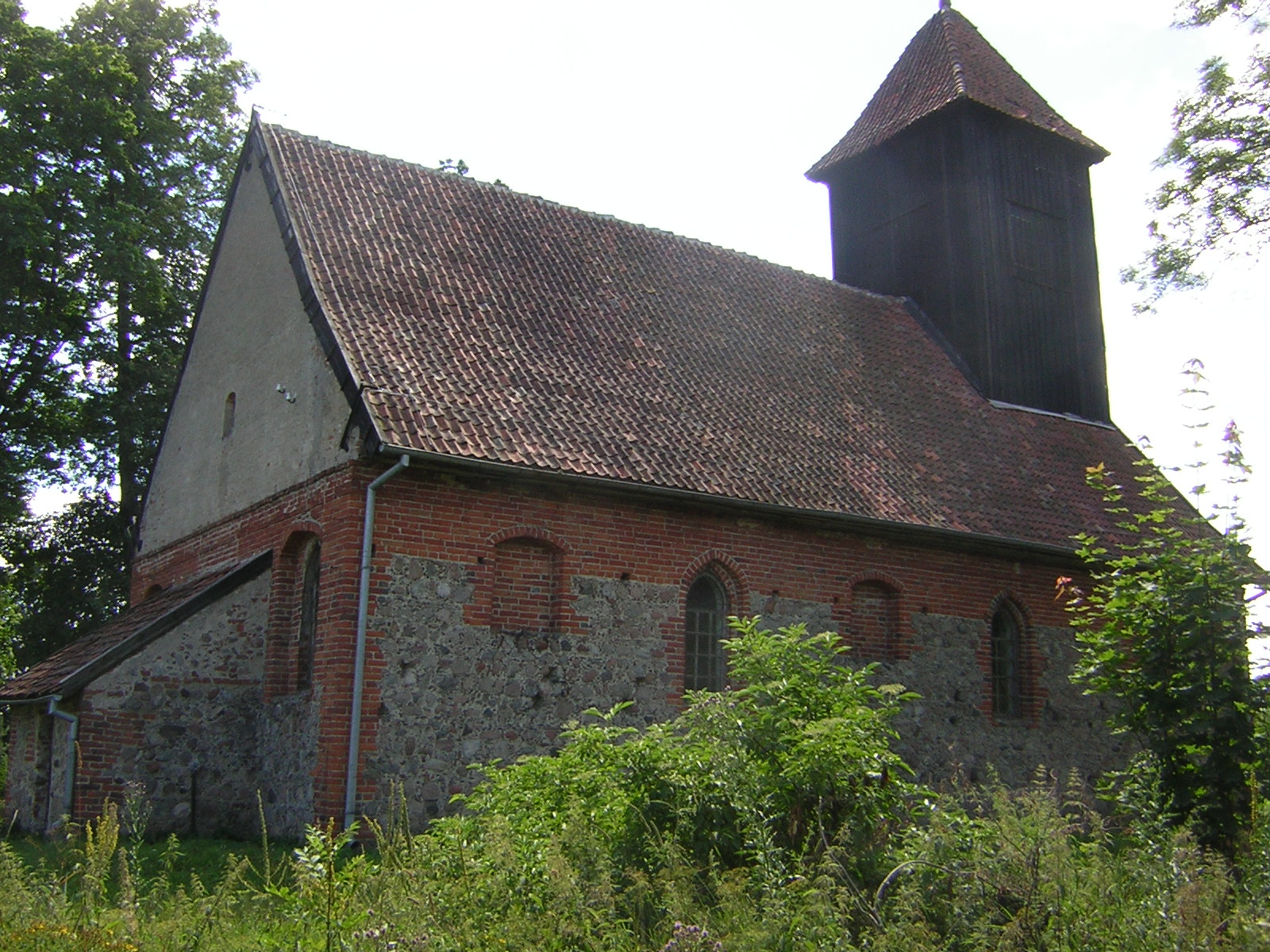

- Location within Poland
- Coordinates: 53°26′N 20°5′E
- Country: Poland
- Voivodeship: Warmian-Masurian
- County: Ostróda
- Gmina: Dąbrówno
- Population: 230

Leszcz [lɛʂt͡ʂ] is a village in the administrative district of Gmina Dąbrówno, within Ostróda County, Warmian-Masurian Voivodeship, in northern Poland.
