= Orlik, Warmian-Masurian Voivodeship =

Orlik
- Settlement
- Location within Poland
- Coordinates: 53°43′29″N 20°2′51″E
- Country: Poland
- Voivodeship: Warmian-Masurian
- County: Ostróda
- Gmina: Łukta

Orlik (Polish pronunciation: [ˈɔrlik]) is a settlement in the administrative district of Gmina Łukta, within Ostróda County, Warmian-Masurian Voivodeship, in northern Poland.
