= Marynowo, Warmian-Masurian Voivodeship =

Marynowo
- Settlement
- Location within Poland
- Coordinates: 53°35′54″N 19°49′57″E
- Country: Poland
- Voivodeship: Warmian-Masurian
- County: Ostróda
- Gmina: Ostróda

Marynowo ([marɨˈnɔvɔ]; German: Marienhof) is a settlement in the administrative district of Gmina Ostróda, within Ostróda County, Warmian-Masurian Voivodeship, in northern Poland.
