= Kotkowo, Ostróda County =

Kotkowo
- Village
- Location within Poland
- Coordinates: 53°50′N 19°59′E
- Country: Poland
- Voivodeship: Warmian-Masurian
- County: Ostróda
- Gmina: Łukta
- Population: 50

Kotkowo [kɔtˈkɔvɔ] is a village in the administrative district of Gmina Łukta, within Ostróda County, Warmian-Masurian Voivodeship, in northern Poland.
