= Okrągłe, Ostróda County =

Okrągłe
- Village
- Location within Poland
- Coordinates: 53°26′N 19°59′E
- Country: Poland
- Voivodeship: Warmian-Masurian
- County: Ostróda
- Gmina: Dąbrówno
- Population: 170

Okrągłe [ɔˈkrɔnɡwɛ] is a village in the administrative district of Gmina Dąbrówno, within Ostróda County, Warmian-Masurian Voivodeship, in northern Poland.
