= Rudno, Warmian-Masurian Voivodeship =

Rudno
- Village
- Location within Poland
- Coordinates: 53°37′N 19°57′E
- Country: Poland
- Voivodeship: Warmian-Masurian
- County: Ostróda
- Gmina: Ostróda

Rudno ([ˈrudnɔ]; German: Rauden) is a village in the administrative district of Gmina Ostróda, within Ostróda County, Warmian-Masurian Voivodeship, in northern Poland.
