= Tułodziad =

- Village
- Location within Poland
- Coordinates: 53°31′N 20°1′E
- Country: Poland
- Voivodeship: Warmian-Masurian
- County: Ostróda
- Gmina: Dąbrówno
- Population: 400

Tułodziad [tuˈwɔd͡ʑat] is a village in the administrative district of Gmina Dąbrówno, within Ostróda County, Warmian-Masurian Voivodeship, in northern Poland.
