= Janowo, Ostróda County =

Janowo
- Settlement
- Location within Poland
- Coordinates: 53°31′19″N 19°58′00″E
- Country: Poland
- Voivodeship: Warmian-Masurian
- County: Ostróda
- Gmina: Ostróda

Janowo ([jaˈnɔvɔ]; German: Johannisberg) is a settlement in the administrative district of Gmina Ostróda, within Ostróda County, Warmian-Masurian Voivodeship, in northern Poland.
