= Sobno =

- Village
- Location within Poland
- Coordinates: 53°51′N 20°7′E
- Country: Poland
- Voivodeship: Warmian-Masurian
- County: Ostróda
- Gmina: Łukta
- Elevation: 110 m (360 ft)
- Population: 30

Sobno [ˈsɔbnɔ] is a village in the administrative district of Gmina Łukta, within Ostróda County, Warmian-Masurian Voivodeship, in northern Poland.
