= Ryńskie =

Village in Gmina Ostróda, Poland

- Village
- Location within Poland
- Coordinates: 53°38′43″N 19°54′27″E
- Country: Poland
- Voivodeship: Warmian-Masurian
- County: Ostróda
- Gmina: Ostróda

Ryńskie ([ˈrɨɲskʲɛ]; German: Rheinsgut) is a village in the administrative district of Gmina Ostróda, within Ostróda County, Warmian-Masurian Voivodeship, in northern Poland.
