= Niedźwiady, Warmian-Masurian Voivodeship =

Niedźwiady
- Village
- Location within Poland
- Coordinates: 53°47′42″N 20°00′46″E
- Country: Poland
- Voivodeship: Warmian-Masurian
- County: Ostróda
- Gmina: Łukta

Niedźwiady [ɲɛd͡ʑˈvjadɨ] is a village in the administrative district of Gmina Łukta, within Ostróda County, Warmian-Masurian Voivodeship, in northern Poland.
