= Gierłoż, Ostróda County =

Gierłoż
- Village
- Location within Poland
- Coordinates: 53°36′43″N 19°46′15″E
- Country: Poland
- Voivodeship: Warmian-Masurian
- County: Ostróda
- Gmina: Ostróda

Gierłoż ([ˈɡʲɛrwɔʂ]; German: Görlitz) is a village in the administrative district of Gmina Ostróda, within Ostróda County, Warmian-Masurian Voivodeship, in northern Poland.
