= Jablonové =

Jablonové may refer to several villages in Slovakia:

- Jablonové, Bytča District in the Žilina Region
- Jablonové, Malacky District in the Bratislava Region

== See also ==
- Jablonov - Prešov Region
- Jabłonowo (disambiguation) Polish toponym
- Yablonovo Russian toponym
