= Gmina Dąbrówno =

Gmina Dąbrówno Dąbrówno Commune
- Gmina
- Flag Coat of arms
- Interactive map of Gmina Dąbrówno
- Coordinates (Dąbrówno): 53°26′N 20°2′E
- Country: Poland
- Voivodeship: Warmian-Masurian
- County: Ostróda
- Seat: Dąbrówno

Area
  - Total: 165.37 km^{2} (63.85 sq mi)

Population (2006)
  - Total: 4,369
  - Density: 26.42/km^{2} (68.43/sq mi)
- Website: http://www.dabrowno.pl/

Gmina Dąbrówno is a rural gmina (administrative district) in Ostróda County, Warmian-Masurian Voivodeship, in northern Poland. Its seat is the village of Dąbrówno, which lies approximately 30 kilometres (19 mi) south of Ostróda and 50 km (31 mi) south-west of the regional capital Olsztyn.

The gmina covers an area of 165.37 square kilometres (63.8 sq mi), and as of 2006 its total population is 4,369.

The gmina contains part of the protected area called Dylewo Hills Landscape Park.

== Villages ==
Gmina Dąbrówno contains the villages and settlements of Bartki, Dąbrowa, Dąbrówno, Elgnowo, Fiugajki, Gardyny, Jabłonowo, Jagodziny, Jakubowo, Kalbornia, Leszcz, Lewałd Wielki, Łogdowo, Marwałd, Odmy, Okrągłe, Osiekowo, Ostrowite, Pląchawy, Samin, Saminek, Stare Miasto, Tułodziad, Wądzyn and Wierzbica.

== Neighbouring gminas ==
Gmina Dąbrówno is bordered by the gminas of Działdowo, Grunwald, Kozłowo, Lubawa, Ostróda and Rybno.
