= RYN (disambiguation) =

RYN may refer to:

- Royan - Médis Aerodrome, France (by IATA code)
- Roydon railway station (by National Rail station code)
- Ryan Airfield. in Tucson, Arizona (by FAA code)
- Ryan International Airlines (by ICAO code)

== See also ==
- Ryn (disambiguation)
