= Gmina Łukta =

Gmina Łukta Łukta Commune
- Gmina
- Coat of arms
- Interactive map of Gmina Łukta
- Coordinates (Łukta): 53°48′19″N 20°5′7″E
- Country: Poland
- Voivodeship: Warmian-Masurian
- County: Ostróda
- Seat: Łukta

Area
  - Total: 184.71 km^{2} (71.32 sq mi)

Population (2006)
  - Total: 4,458
  - Density: 24.14/km^{2} (62.51/sq mi)
- Website: http://www.lukta.com.pl

Gmina Łukta is a rural gmina (administrative district) in Ostróda County, Warmian-Masurian Voivodeship, in northern Poland. Its seat is the village of Łukta, which lies approximately 15 kilometres (9 mi) north-east of Ostróda and 28 km (17 mi) west of the regional capital Olsztyn.

The gmina covers an area of 184.71 square kilometres (71.3 sq mi), and as of 2006 its total population is 4,458.

== Villages ==
Gmina Łukta contains the villages and settlements of Białka, Chudy Dwór, Dąg, Dragolice, Florczaki, Ględy, Gucin, Kojdy, Komorowo, Kotkowo, Kozia Góra, Łukta, Lusajny, Markuszewo, Maronie, Molza, Mostkowo, Niedźwiady, Nowaczyzna, Nowe Ramoty, Orlik, Pelnik, Plichta, Pupki, Ramoty, Sarni Dół, Skwary, Sobno, Spórka, Strzałkowo, Swojki, Szeląg, Trokajny, Worliny, Wynki and Zajączkowo.

== Neighbouring gminas ==
Gmina Łukta is bordered by the gminas of Gietrzwałd, Jonkowo, Miłomłyn, Morąg, Ostróda and Świątki.
