= Ryn, Ostróda County =

Ryn
- Village
- Location within Poland
- Coordinates: 53°36′N 20°0′E
- Country: Poland
- Voivodeship: Warmian-Masurian
- County: Ostróda
- Gmina: Ostróda

Ryn ([rɨn]; German: Rhein) is a village in the administrative district of Gmina Ostróda, within Ostróda County, Warmian-Masurian Voivodeship, in northern Poland.
