= Lewałd Wielki =

- Village
- Location within Poland
- Coordinates: 53°27′N 20°0′E
- Country: Poland
- Voivodeship: Warmian-Masurian
- County: Ostróda
- Gmina: Dąbrówno
- Population: 240

Lewałd Wielki (Polish pronunciation: [ˈlɛvawt ˈfjɛlkʲi]) is a village in the administrative district of Gmina Dąbrówno, within Ostróda County, Warmian-Masurian Voivodeship, in northern Poland.
