= Jabłonowo, Ostróda County =

Jabłonowo
- Village
- Location within Poland
- Coordinates: 53°27′11″N 20°01′52″E
- Country: Poland
- Voivodeship: Warmian-Masurian
- County: Ostróda
- Gmina: Dąbrówno

Jabłonowo [jabwɔˈnɔvɔ] is a village in the administrative district of Gmina Dąbrówno, within Ostróda County, Warmian-Masurian Voivodeship, in northern Poland.
