= Sarni Dół =

- Settlement
- Location within Poland
- Coordinates: 53°47′41″N 20°0′39″E
- Country: Poland
- Voivodeship: Warmian-Masurian
- County: Ostróda
- Gmina: Łukta
- Population: 30

Sarni Dół (Polish pronunciation: [ˈsarɲi ˈduw]) is a settlement in the administrative district of Gmina Łukta, within Ostróda County, Warmian-Masurian Voivodeship, in northern Poland.
