= Stare Jabłonki =

- Village
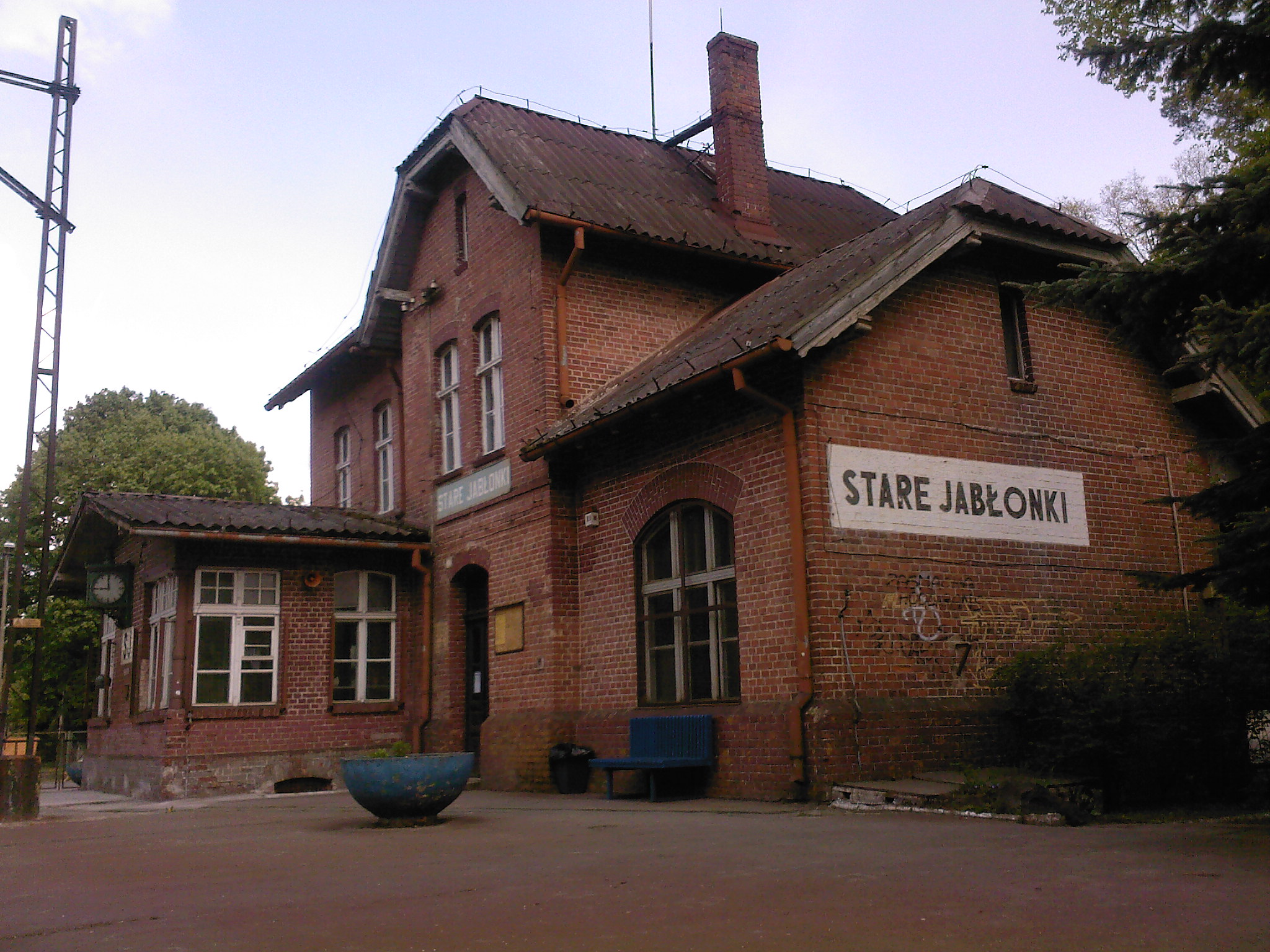
- Train station

- Location within Poland
- Coordinates: 53°42′N 20°5′E
- Country: Poland
- Voivodeship: Warmian-Masurian
- County: Ostróda
- Gmina: Ostróda

Population
  - Total: 700
- Time zone: UTC+1 (CET)
  - Summer (DST): UTC+2 (CEST)
- Vehicle registration: NOS

Stare Jabłonki ([ˈstarɛ jaˈbwɔnki]; German: Alt Jablonken, 1938-1945 Altfinken) is a village in the administrative district of Gmina Ostróda, within Ostróda County, Warmian-Masurian Voivodeship, in northern Poland.

== History ==
120 Polish citizens were murdered by Nazi Germany in the village during World War II.

== Sports ==
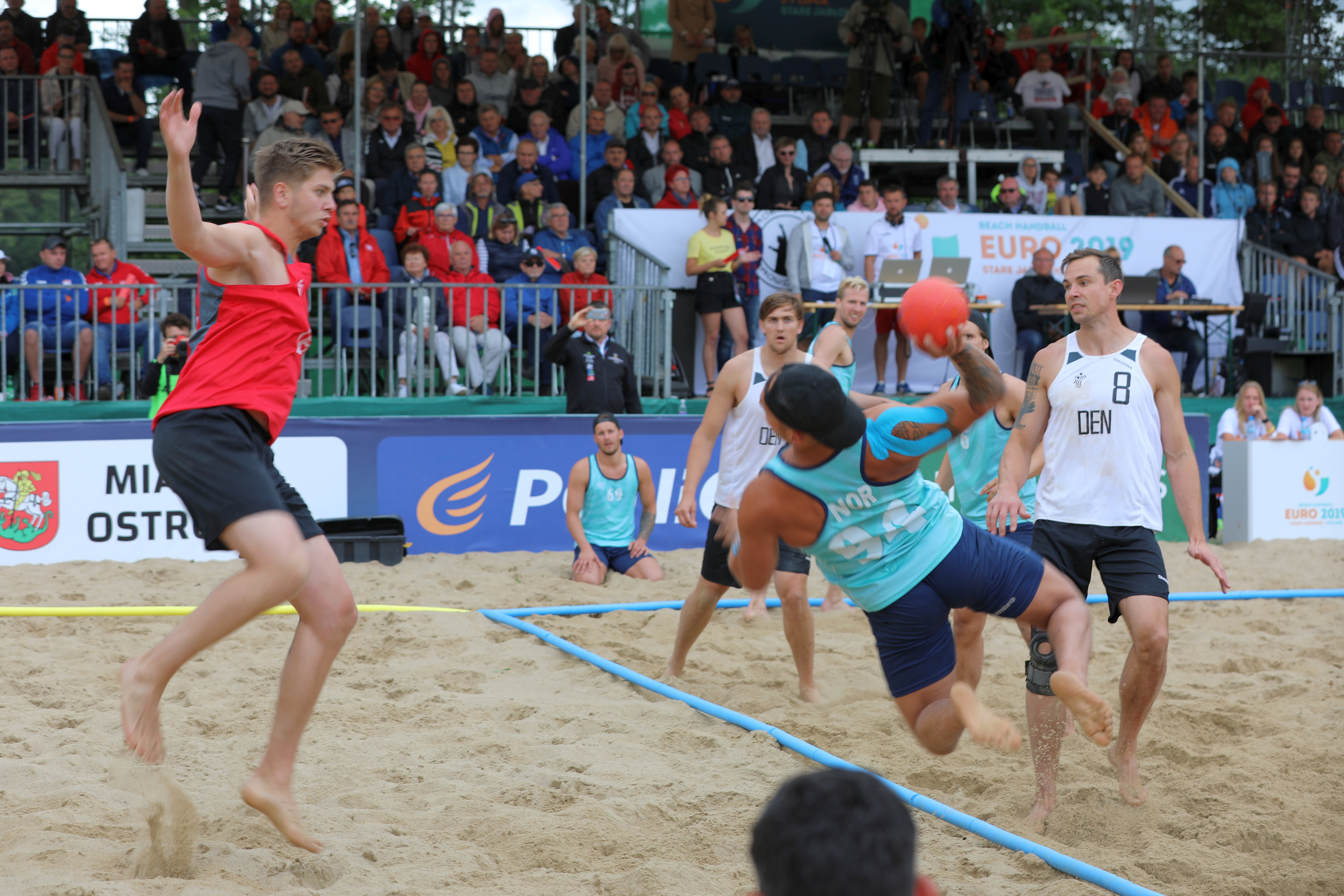
Final match of the Beachhandball European Championships 2019: Denmark vs Norway

Stare Jabłonki is internationally known as the venue for international beach volleyball tournaments. So the place is the regular venue of a beach volleyball tournament of the FIVB Beach Volleyball World Tour. Since 2004, the beach volleyball players play in the small village. In 2013 the FIVB Beach Volleyball World Championships took place here, in 2019 the European Beach Handball Championships.

There is also the football club Szeląg Stare Jabłonki.
