= Gmina Ostróda =

Gmina Ostróda Ostróda Commune
- Gmina
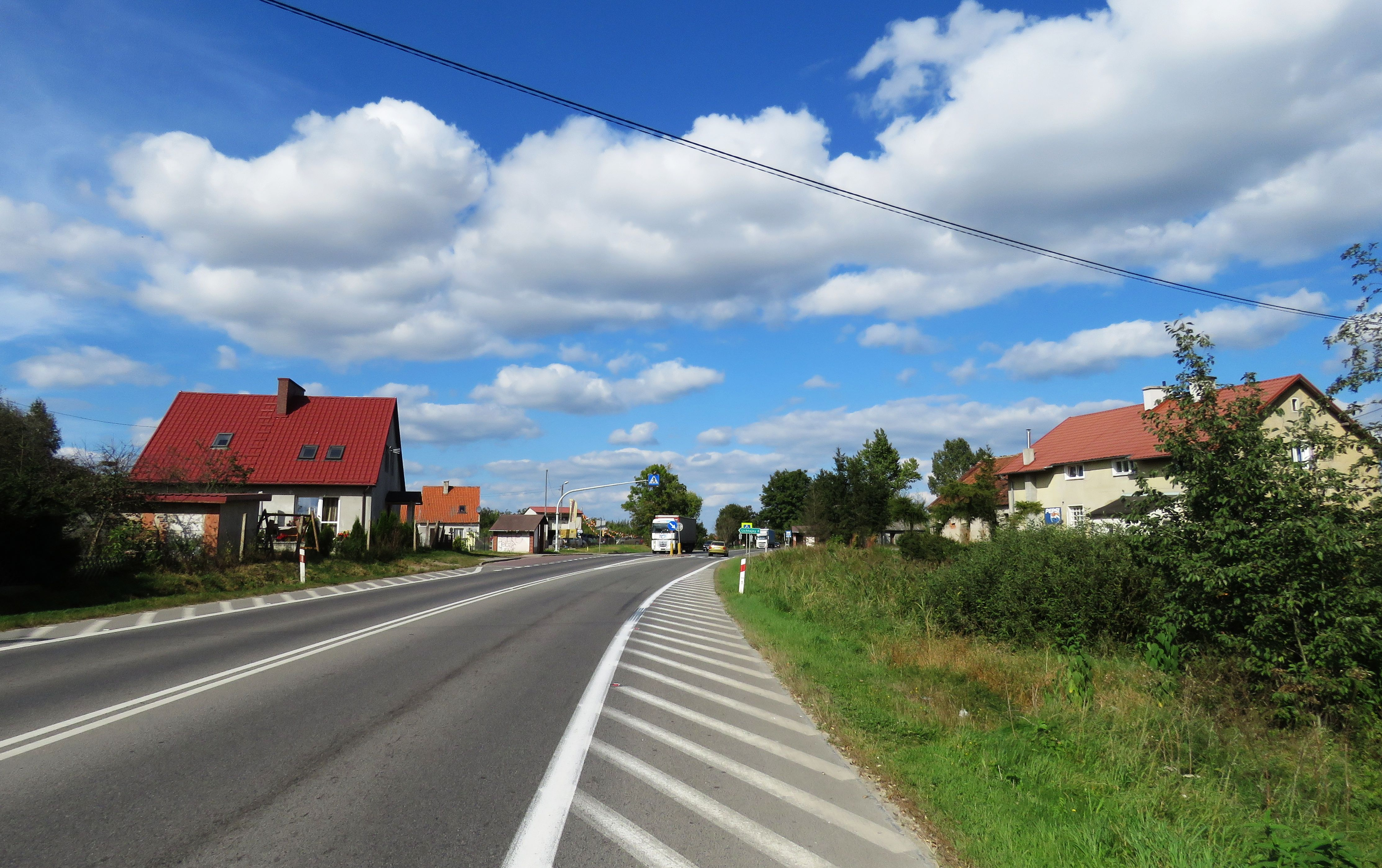

- Flag Coat of arms
- Interactive map of Gmina Ostróda
- Coordinates (Ostróda): 53°42′N 19°58′E
- Country: Poland
- Voivodeship: Warmian-Masurian
- County: Ostróda
- Seat: Ostróda

Area
  - Total: 401.06 km^{2} (154.85 sq mi)

Population (2006)
  - Total: 15,501
  - Density: 38.650/km^{2} (100.10/sq mi)
- Website: http://www.gminaostroda.pl/

Gmina Ostróda is a rural gmina (administrative district) in Ostróda County, Warmian-Masurian Voivodeship, in northern Poland. Its seat is the town of Ostróda, although the town is not part of the territory of the gmina.

The gmina covers an area of 401.06 square kilometres (154.9 sq mi), and as of 2006 its total population is 15,501.

The gmina contains part of the protected area called Dylewo Hills Landscape Park.

== Villages ==
Gmina Ostróda contains the villages and settlements of:

- Bałcyny
- Bednarki
- Brzydowo
- Buńki
- Cibory
- Ciemniak
- Czarny Róg
- Czerwona Karczma
- Czyżówka
- Durąg
- Dziadyk
- Gąski
- Gierłoż
- Giętlewo
- Glaznoty
- Górka
- Grabin
- Grabinek
- Gruda
- Idzbark
- Jabłonka
- Jankowiec
- Janowo
- Kajkowo
- Kątno
- Klonowo
- Kraplewo
- Lesiak Lipowski
- Lesiak Ostródzki
- Lichtajny
- Lipowiec
- Lipowo
- Lubajny
- Marciniaki
- Marynowo
- Międzylesie
- Miejska Wola
- Młyn Idzbarski
- Morliny
- Naprom
- Nastajki
- Nowa Gierłoż
- Nowe Siedlisko
- Nowy Folwark
- Ornowo
- Ostrowin
- Pancerzyn
- Pietrzwałd
- Pobórze
- Podlesie
- Prusowo
- Przylądek
- Reszki
- Rudno
- Ruś Mała
- Ryn
- Ryńskie
- Samborówko
- Samborowo
- Smykówko
- Smykowo
- Stare Jabłonki
- Staszkowo
- Szafranki
- Szklarnia
- Szyldak
- Turznica
- Tyrowo
- Wałdowo
- Warlity Wielkie
- Wirwajdy
- Wólka Klonowska
- Wólka Lichtajńska
- Worniny
- Wygoda
- Wysoka Wieś
- Wyżnice
- Zabłocie
- Zajączki
- Zawady Małe
- Żurejny
- Zwierzewo

== Neighbouring gminas ==
Gmina Ostróda is bordered by the town of Ostróda and by the gminas of Dąbrówno, Gietrzwałd, Grunwald, Iława, Lubawa, Łukta, Miłomłyn and Olsztynek.
