= Yablonovo, Valuysky District, Belgorod Oblast =

Yablonovo Яблоново
- Selo
- Interactive map of Yablonovo
- Coordinates: 50°12′N 38°01′E
- Country: Russia
- Federal subject: Belgorod Oblast

Population
  - Estimate (2010): 421 )
- Time zone: UTC+3 (MSK)
- Postal code: 309952
- OKTMO ID: 14620480101

Yablonovo (Russian: Яблоново) is a rural locality (a selo) in Valuysky District, Belgorod Oblast, Russia. The population was 421 as of 2010. There are 7 streets.

== Geography ==
Yablonovo is located 12 km west of Valuyki (the district's administrative centre) by road. Agoshevka is the nearest rural locality.
