= Lewald (surname) =

Lewald is a German surname. Notable people with the surname include:

- August Lewald (1792–1871), German author
- Fanny Lewald (1811–1889), German author and activist, niece of August
- Theodor Lewald (1860–1947), German civil servant
