= Ostróda County =

Ostróda County Powiat ostródzki
- County
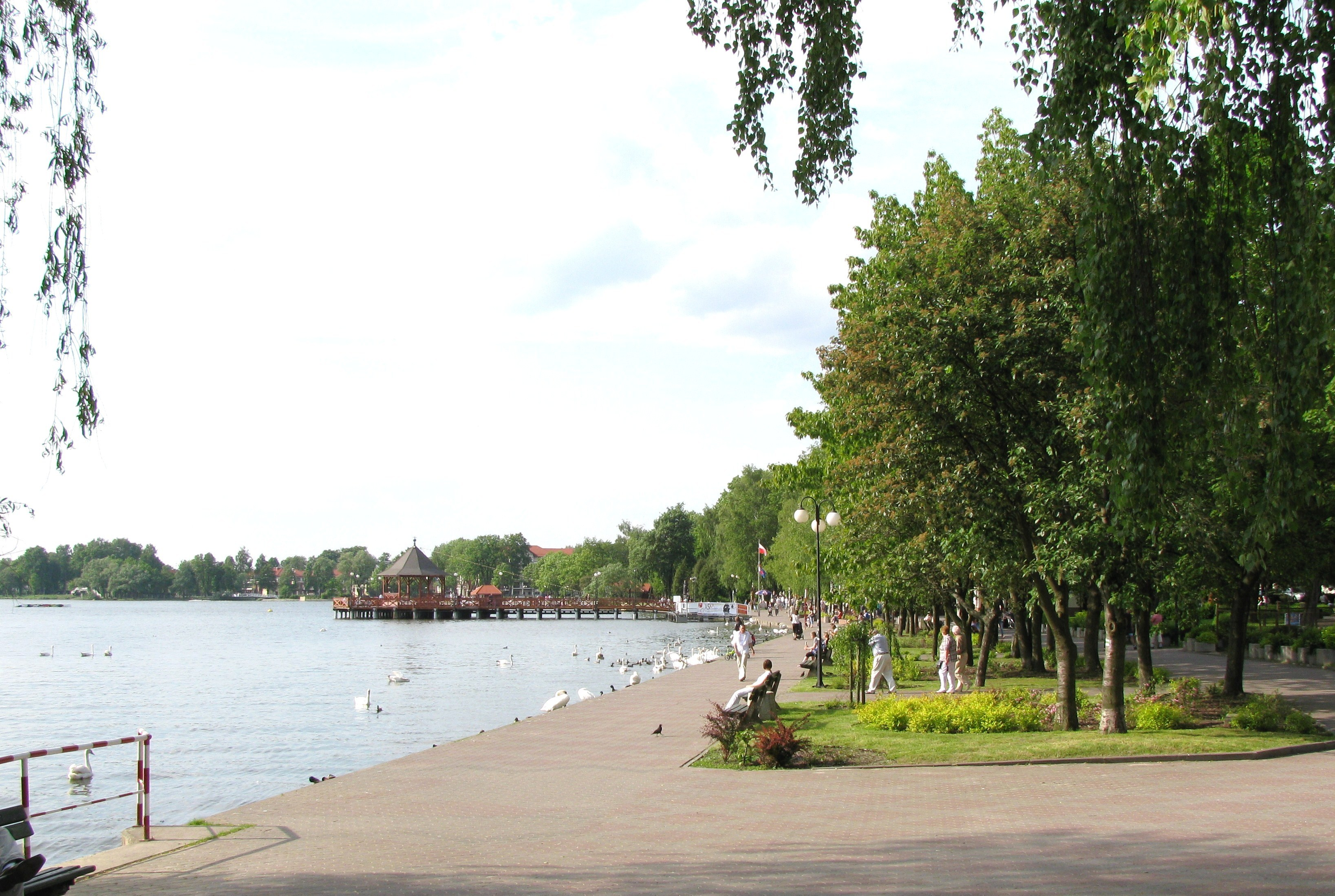

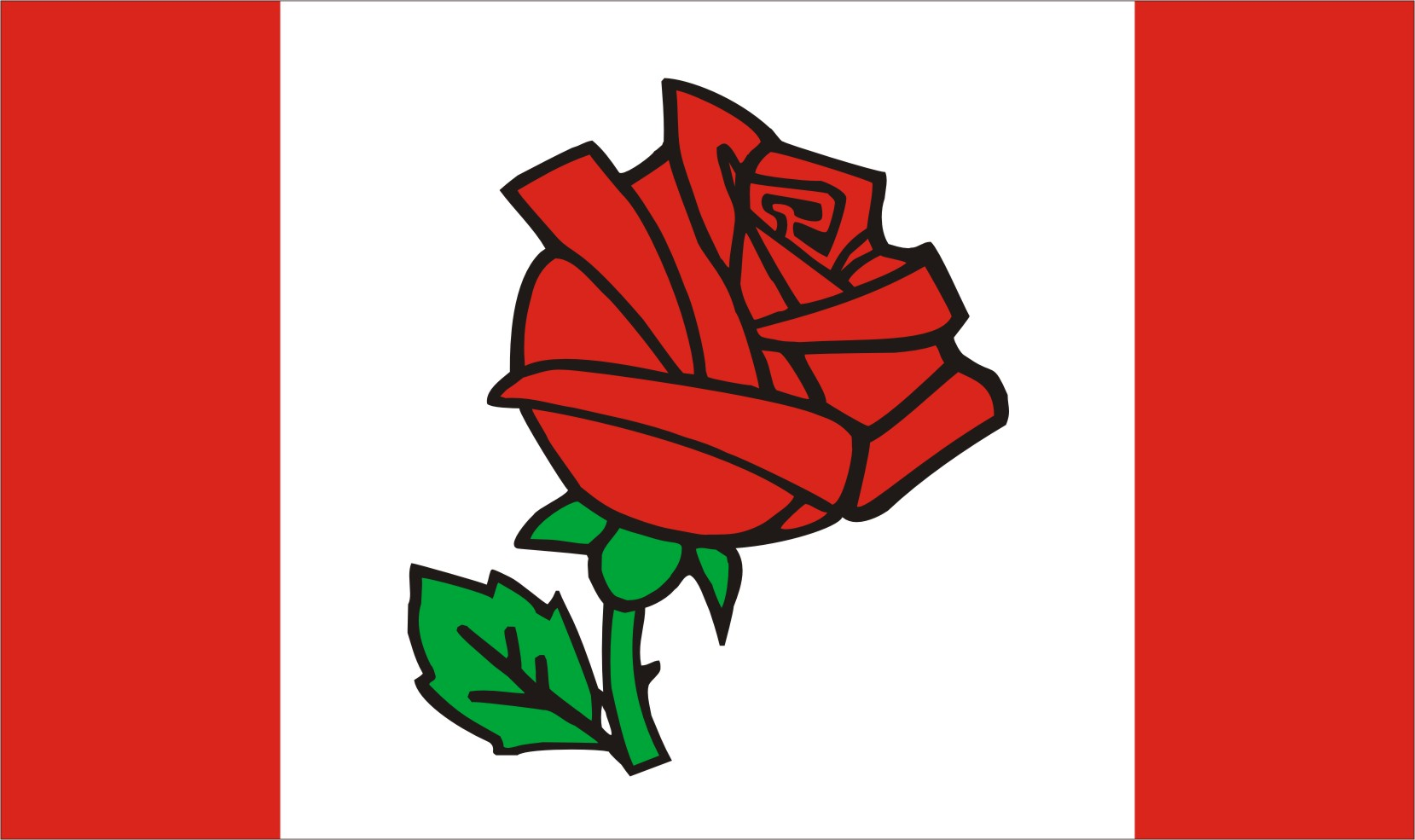
- Flag Coat of arms

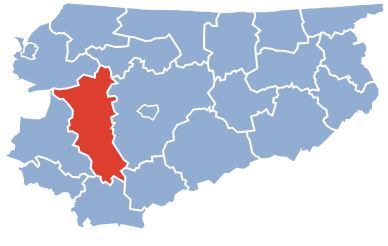
- Location within the voivodeship

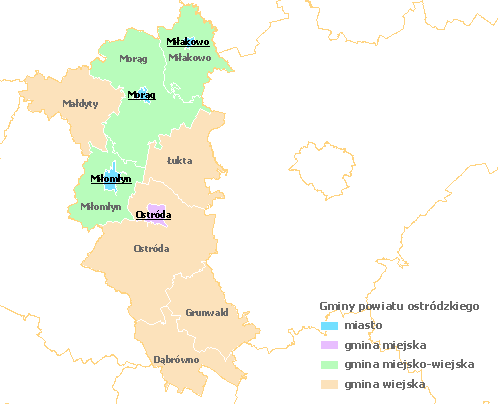
- Division into gminas
- Coordinates (Ostróda): 53°42′N 19°58′E
- Country: Poland
- Voivodeship: Warmian-Masurian
- Seat: Ostróda
- Gminas: Total 9 (incl. 1 urban): Ostróda; Gmina Dąbrówno; Gmina Grunwald; Gmina Łukta; Gmina Małdyty; Gmina Miłakowo; Gmina Miłomłyn; Gmina Morąg; Gmina Ostróda

Area
  - Total: 1,764.89 km^{2} (681.43 sq mi)

Population (2006)
  - Total: 105,286
  - Density: 59.6558/km^{2} (154.508/sq mi)
  - Urban: 52,886
  - Rural: 52,400
- Car plates: NOS
- Website: www.powiat.ostroda.pl/en/

Ostróda County (Polish: powiat ostródzki) is a unit of territorial administration and local government (powiat) in Warmian-Masurian Voivodeship, northern Poland. It came into being on January 1, 1999, as a result of the Polish local government reforms passed in 1998. Its administrative seat and largest town is Ostróda, which lies 37 kilometres (23 mi) west of the regional capital Olsztyn. The county contains three other towns: Morąg, 25 km (16 mi) north of Ostróda, Miłakowo, 34 km (21 mi) north of Ostróda, and Miłomłyn, 12 km (7 mi) north-west of Ostróda.

The county covers an area of 1,764.89 square kilometres (681.4 sq mi). As of 2006 its total population is 105,286, out of which the population of Ostróda is 33,419, that of Morąg is 14,497, that of Miłakowo is 2,665, that of Miłomłyn is 2,305, and the rural population is 52,400.

== Neighbouring counties ==
Ostróda County is bordered by Lidzbark County to the north-east, Olsztyn County to the east, Nidzica County to the south-east, Działdowo County to the south, Iława County and Sztum County to the west, and Elbląg County to the north-west.

== Administrative divisions ==
The county is subdivided into nine gminas (one urban, three urban-rural and five rural). These are listed in the following table, in descending order of population.

Gmina	Type	Area (km^{2})	Population (2006)	Seat
Ostróda	urban	14.2	33,419	
Gmina Morąg	urban-rural	310.6	24,886	Morąg
Gmina Ostróda	rural	401.1	15,501	Ostróda *
Gmina Małdyty	rural	188.9	6,281	Małdyty
Gmina Miłakowo	urban-rural	159.4	5,736	Miłakowo
Gmina Grunwald	rural	179.8	5,648	Gierzwałd
Gmina Miłomłyn	urban-rural	160.9	4,988	Miłomłyn
Gmina Łukta	rural	184.7	4,458	Łukta
Gmina Dąbrówno	rural	165.4	4,369	Dąbrówno
* seat not part of the gmina

== Historical population ==
In 1828, Ostróda County (German: Kreis Osterode) had 32,845 inhabitants. By mother tongue, they were 23,577 (~72%) Polish and 9,268 (~28%) German.
