= Battle of Mohrungen =

1807 Battle during the War of the Fourth Coalition

- Part of the War of the Fourth Coalition
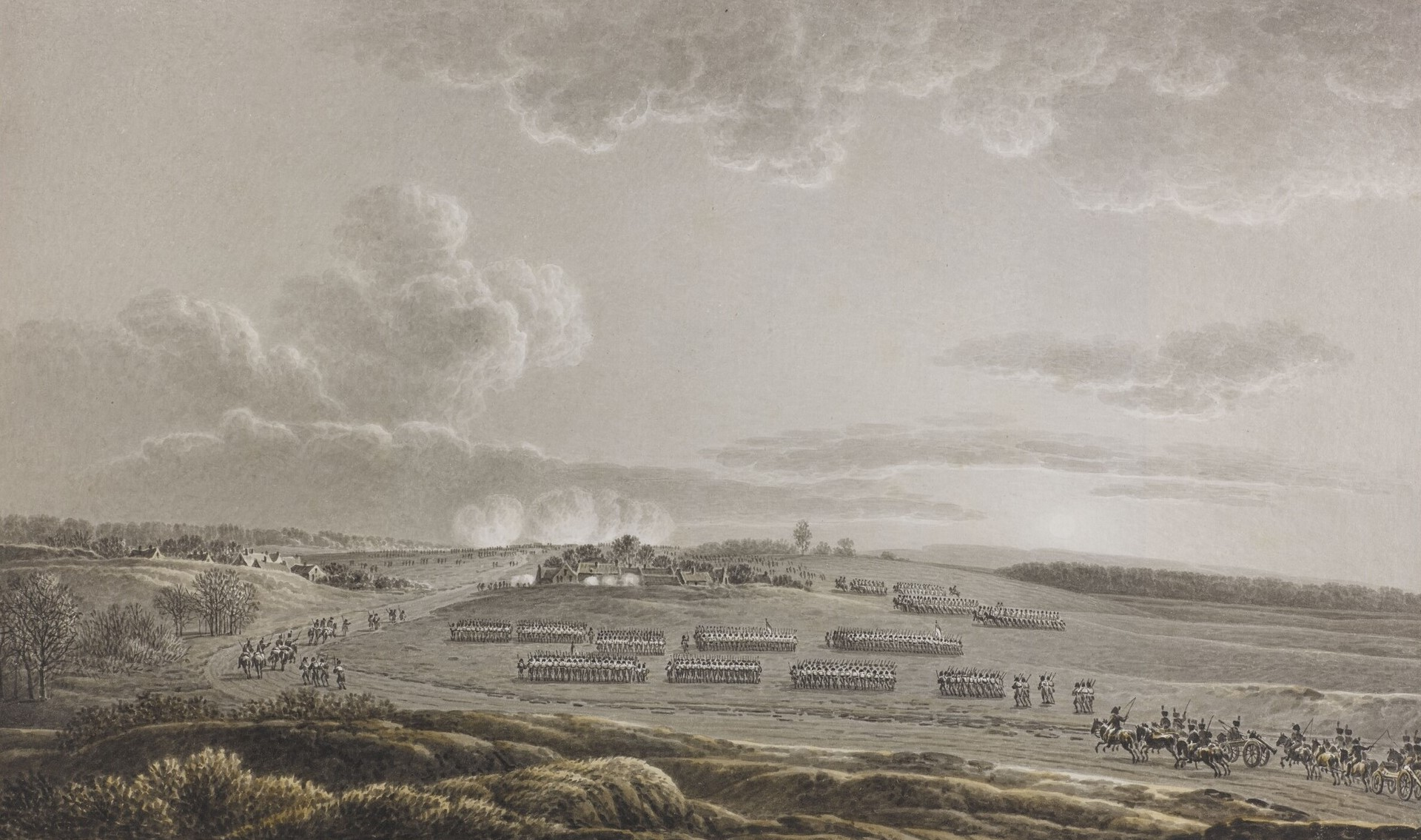
- Battle of Mohrungen by Benjamin Zix, 1807–1810
Date	25 January 1807
Location	Mohrungen, East Prussia (modern Morąg, Poland) 53°55′00″N 19°56′00″E
Result	French victory

Belligerents
(France) French Empire	(Russia) Russian Empire; Kingdom of Prussia

Commanders and leaders
(France) Jean-Baptiste Bernadotte (France) Pierre Dupont de l'Étang	(Russia) Yevgeni Markov (Russia) Levin August von Bennigsen (Kingdom of Prussia) Anton von L'Estocq

Strength
9,000; 36 guns	12,000 to 16,000

Casualties and losses
1,096 to 2,000; • 700 killed and wounded; • 400 captured	1,400 to 2,000; • 1,100 killed and wounded; • 300 captured

War of the Fourth Coalition
⬤ current battle
⬤ Napoleon not in command
⬤ Napoleon in command

In the Battle of Mohrungen on 25 January 1807, most of a First French Empire corps under the leadership of Marshal Jean-Baptiste Bernadotte fought a strong Russian Empire advance guard led by Major General Yevgeni Ivanovich Markov. The French pushed back the main Russian force, but a cavalry raid on the French supply train caused Bernadotte to call off his attacks. After driving off the cavalry, Bernadotte withdrew and the town was occupied by the army of General Levin August, Count von Bennigsen. The fighting took place in and around Morąg in northern Poland, which in 1807 was the East Prussian town of Mohrungen. The action was part of the War of the Fourth Coalition in the Napoleonic Wars.

After demolishing the army of the Kingdom of Prussia in a whirlwind campaign in October and November 1806, Napoleon's Grande Armée seized Warsaw. After two bitterly fought actions against the Russian army, the French emperor decided to place his troops into winter quarters. However, in wintry weather, the Russian commander moved north into East Prussia and then struck west at Napoleon's left flank. As one of Bennigsen's columns advanced west it encountered forces under Bernadotte. The Russian advance was nearly at an end as Napoleon gathered strength for a powerful counterstroke.

== Background ==
After the Battle of Czarnowo on 23 December 1806 and the bloody battles of Pułtusk and Gołymin on 26 December, the opposing Russian and French armies went into winter quarters. Emperor Napoleon wanted time to reorganize the Grande Armée's logistical arrangements after their long autumn campaign. In addition, his veteran French troops had expressed displeasure at having to fight in Poland during the harsh winter weather.

In late 1806, Field Marshal Mikhail Kamensky's Russian army in Poland constituted two major wings under Generals Bennigsen and Friedrich Wilhelm von Buxhoeveden (Buxhöwden). Bennigsen commanded Lieutenant General Alexander Ivanovich Ostermann-Tolstoy's 2nd Division, Lieutenant General Fabian Gottlieb von Osten-Sacken's 3rd Division, Lieutenant General Dmitry Golitsyn's 4th Division, and Lieutenant General Alexander Karlovich Sedmoratsky's 6th Division. The initial strength of Bennigsen's force, before the December battles, was 49,000 infantry, 11,000 regular cavalry, 4,000 cossacks, 2,700 artillerymen, 900 pioneers, and 276 guns. Of these, from 55,000 to 60,000 were able to take the field.

Buxhöwden led Lieutenant General Nikolay Tuchkov's 5th Division, Lieutenant General Dmitry Dokhturov's 7th Division, Lieutenant General Peter Kirillovich Essen's 8th Division, and Lieutenant General Heinrich Reinhold von Anrep's 14th Division. Buxhöwden's four divisions fought at the Battle of Austerlitz on 2 December 1805 and had not made up all the losses suffered at that engagement. Consequently, his troops numbered only 29,000 infantry, 7,000 cavalry, 1,200 gunners, and 216 artillery pieces in December 1806. Not counting garrisons, the Prussians could put only 6,000 men into the field in that month.

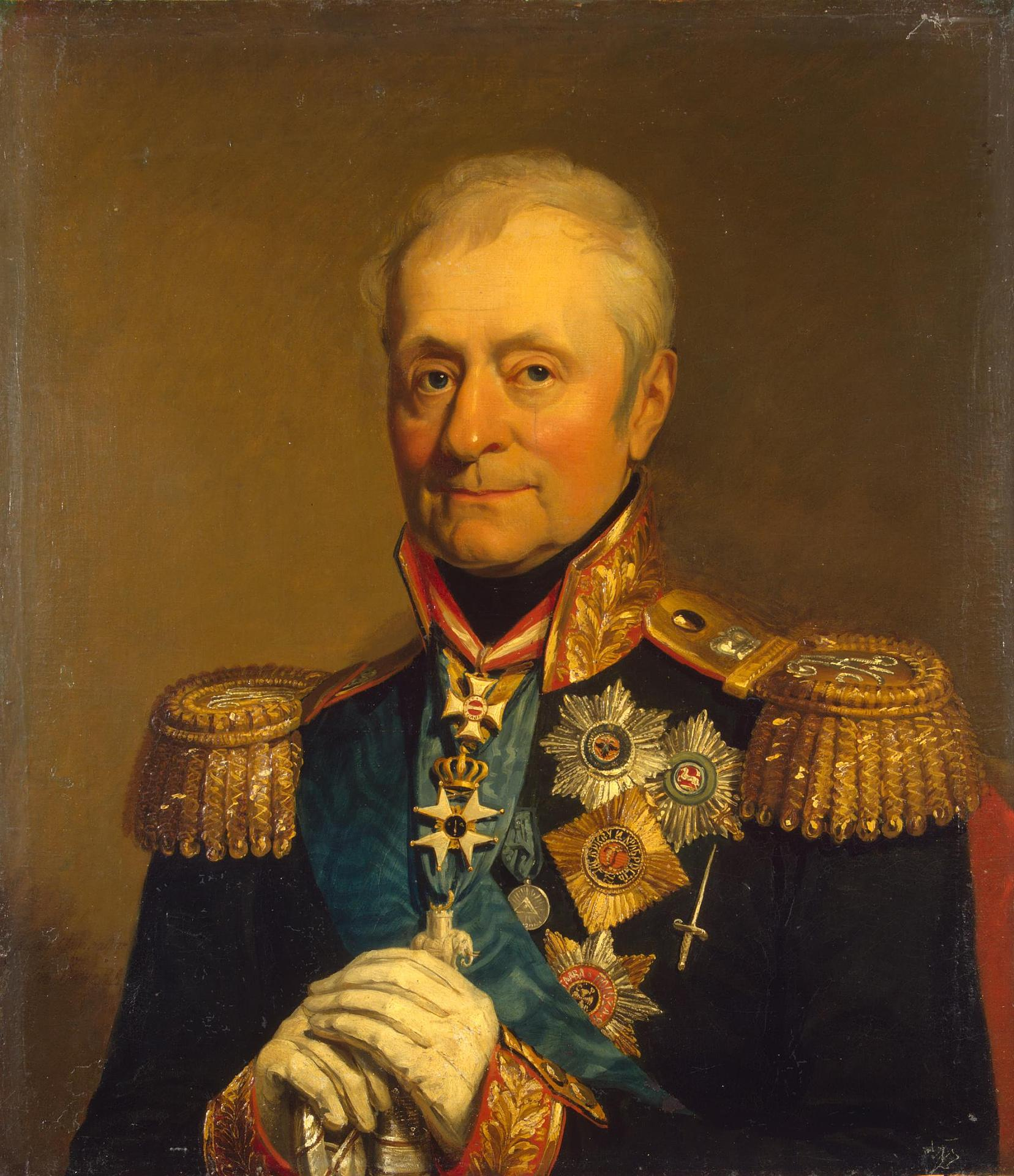
Levin August Bennigsen

In 1806, the Russian field army consisted of 18 divisions. Each division included six 3-battalion infantry regiments, ten squadrons of heavy cavalry, ten squadrons of light cavalry, two heavy foot artillery batteries, three light foot artillery batteries, and one horse artillery battery. Since the foot batteries contained 14 guns apiece and the horse batteries 12 guns, each Russian division nominally controlled as many as 82 field pieces. Typically, the heavy batteries were made up of eight 12-pound cannons, four heavy howitzers, and two light howitzers. The light batteries had the same establishment except that they substituted 6- for 12-pound cannons. Horse batteries were entirely formed from 6-pound cannons.

"Old and worn out in body and mind", the 75-year-old Marshal Kamensky exhibited clear signs that he was no longer fit to command. Around the time Pułtusk was fought, Kamensky left the front. The next day, he appeared in the streets of Grodno without his shirt on and called for a surgeon. Pointing out his many wounds, he demanded that the doctor give him a written statement that he was no longer able to serve. During December, his two lieutenants, of whom Buxhöwden was senior, began to intrigue against one another for the army command. After Pułtusk and Gołymin, the 8th and 14th Divisions remained with Bennigsen, who was not anxious to return them to their rightful wing commander. On 1 January 1807, Bennigsen's wing lay at Nowogród on the south bank of the ice-floe choked Narew River, while Buxhöwden's wing was 9 miles (14.5 km) to the northeast on the north bank. Around this time, Kamensky appeared at the front but his orders were ignored and he permanently withdrew from the campaign. His unstable and violent temperament eventually led to his murder at the hands of a peasant.

Napoleon deployed his corps in a wide arc on the east side of the Vistula River covering Warsaw. He posited Bernadotte's I Corps on the left flank with headquarters at Osterode (Ostróda). In order from left to right came Marshal Michel Ney's VI Corps at Mława, Marshal Nicolas Soult's IV Corps at Gołymin, Marshal Louis-Nicolas Davout's III Corps at Pułtusk, and Marshal Jean Lannes at Serock. Marshal Pierre Augereau's VII Corps stood in a reserve position behind the arc at Płońsk. Marshal Joachim Murat's Reserve Cavalry took up winter quarters in districts to the rear except for General of Division Louis Michel Antoine Sahuc's 4th Dragoon Division, which reported to Bernadotte, and General of Division Antoine Lasalle's Light Cavalry Division which patrolled Soult's front.

== Russian offensive ==
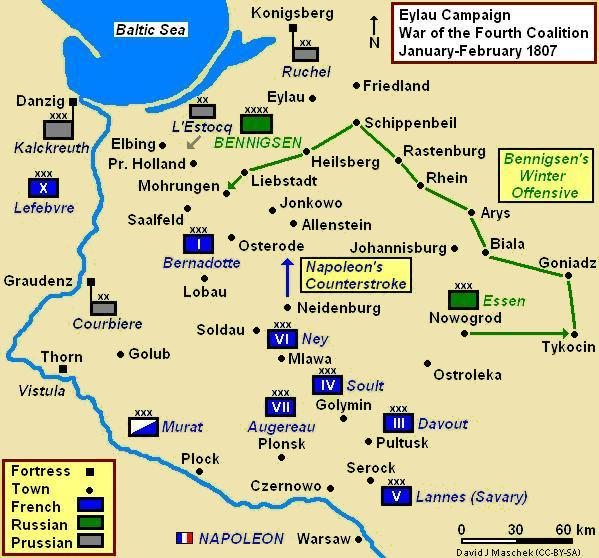
Battle of Eylau Campaign Map, Jan.-Feb. 1807 shows Bennigsen's winter offensive leading up to the Battle of Mohrungen on 25 January 1807. German names are used for towns in East Prussia. See text for Polish names.

In a council of war on 2 January 1807, Buxhöwden and Bennigsen determined to take the offensive against the French. They intended to move north into East Prussia with seven divisions before turning west to attack Napoleon's left flank. The plan called for one division to remain northeast of Warsaw to distract the French. This division would soon be joined by two more that were due to arrive from Moldavia under the command of Lieutenant General Ivan Essen. Lieutenant Generals Dmitri Mikhailovich Volkonski (9th Division) and Petr Ivanovich Meller-Zakomelski (10th Division) led the two units. The Russian leaders hoped to damage Napoleon's left wing and force the French army to fall back to the west bank of the Vistula. The positions gained would be used to launch a spring campaign that might drive the French back to the Oder River.

Still jealous of his rival Buxhöwden, Bennigsen withdrew east to Tykocin with his six divisions rather than join his troops to the right wing of the army. He marched north for Goniądz where he found, to his delight, that Czar Alexander had appointed him army commander and recalled Buxhöwden. From there, he moved west to Biala Piska, arriving there on 14 January. Bennigsen left the 6th Division at Goniądz. Screened from Soult's cavalry screen by the Johannisburg Forest, Bennigsen's northward move into Masuria remained hidden from the French. The Prussian field force under General-Leutnant Anton Wilhelm von L'Estocq withdrew northward to Rastenburg (Kętrzyn).

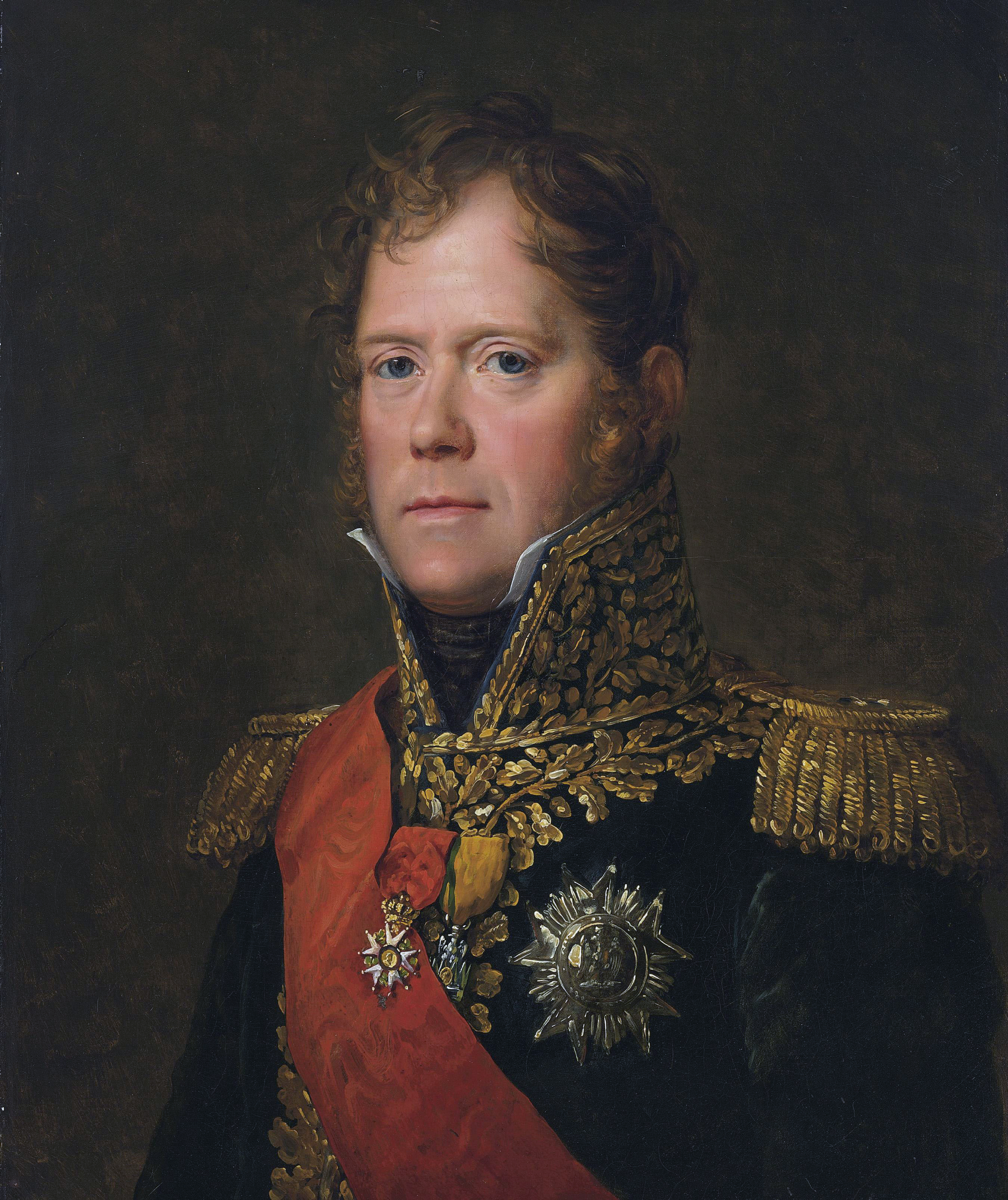
Michel Ney

Meanwhile, Ney, finding his sector devoid of food and forage, disobeyed Napoleon's orders and advanced far northward in the direction of Königsberg. On the 11th his advance guard repulsed a Prussian attack on Schippenbeil (Sępopol). Three days later, Ney estimated that L'Estocq had 9,000 troops while General of Infantry Ernst von Rüchel garrisoned Königsberg with another 4,000. Livid at Ney for his insubordination, Napoleon nevertheless began to take measures in case the Russians reacted to the VI Corps leader's advance. He alerted Augereau to concentrate the VII Corps in readiness to march. The emperor also ordered Marshal François Joseph Lefebvre and the X Corps to protect Thorn (Toruń) and the lower Vistula.

On 19 January, the Russians finally appeared out of the forests, driving Ney's troops from Schippenbeil. After detaching 3,000 men to link with the 6th Division, Bennigsen commanded about 63,000 troops, while L'Estocq had 13,000 in the area. On the 21st, Bennigsen's advance elements were in Heilsberg (Lidzbark Warmiński) with L'Estocq on his right flank. The three Russian advance guards were led by Major Generals Markov, Michael Andreas Barclay de Tolly, and Karl Gustav von Baggovut. Though his cavalry under General of Brigade Auguste Francois-Marie de Colbert-Chabanais was roughly handled, Ney managed to escape southward to Neidenburg (Nidzica).

Having brushed aside Ney, the Russians bore down on Bernadotte's corps. On 24 January, Markov mauled a French unit at Liebstadt (Miłakowo), capturing 300 Frenchmen. Bernadotte quickly assembled General of Division Pierre Dupont's division and General of Brigade Jacques Léonard Laplanche's dragoons at Preussisch Holland (Pasłęk) on his left flank in the northwest. On his own initiative, Bernadotte's chief of staff General of Brigade Nicolas Joseph Maison alerted the I Corps center and right flank. Maison directed General of Division Olivier Rivaud to concentrate his division at Osterode on the right, while General of Division Jean-Baptiste Drouet gathered his troops at Saalfeld (Zalewo) in the center. Maison held General of Brigade Michel Marie Pacthod's 8th Light Infantry Regiment at Mohrungen, while calling Sahuc's other dragoon brigade from the right flank toward the center.

== Battle ==
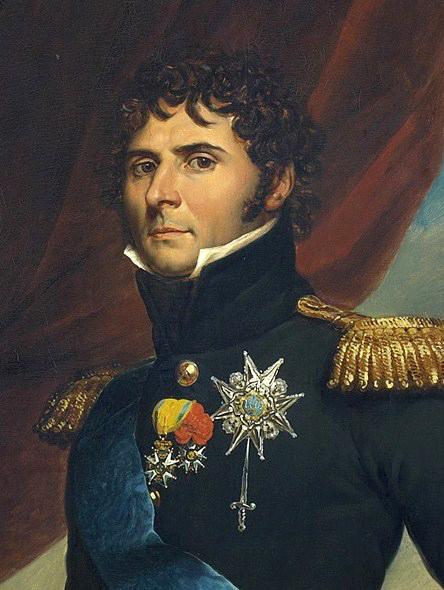
Jean-Baptiste Bernadotte

At noon on 25 January, Markov approached Mohrungen with the right wing advance guard. From prisoners taken at Liebstadt, the Russian general knew that Bernadotte was concentrating at Mohrungen. In fact, the French marshal held the town with nine infantry battalions and 11 cavalry squadrons. This force comprised units of all three I Corps divisions, including the 8th Light Infantry of Rivaud's division plus elements of both Drouet's and Dupont's divisions. When Markov appeared, Bernadotte immediately advanced northward to engage his enemy. He ordered Dupont to march from Preussisch Holland to hit the Russian west flank with the bulk of his division.

Markov's advance guard included the Ekaterinoslav Grenadier Regiment, the Pskov Musketeer Regiment, the 5th, 7th, and 25th Jäger Regiments, six squadrons of the Elisabethgrad Hussar Regiment, four-foot artillery batteries, and one horse artillery battery. The Russian forces numbered anywhere from 9,000< Smith names five regiments, or 15 battalions, while Petre's account states that 17 battalions were engaged to 16,000 men. Until Dupont arrived, Bernadotte had about 9,000 troops available.

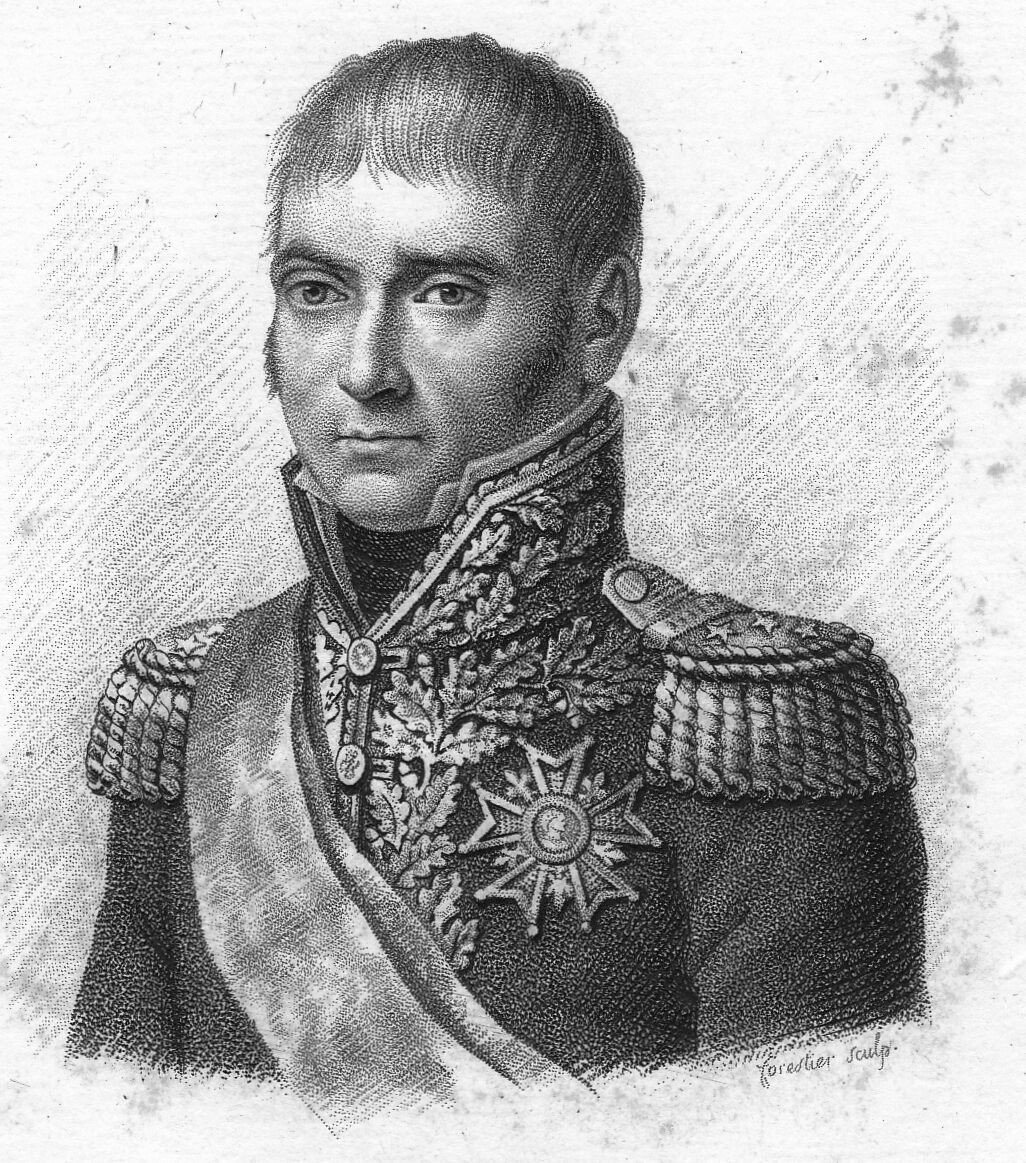
Pierre Dupont

Bernadotte deployed Dupont's 7-battalion 1st Division, which comprised the 9th Light, 32nd Line, and 96th Line Infantry Regiments. The 8th Light Infantry Regiment from Rivaud's 2nd Division was present, as was Drouet's 7-battalion 3rd Division, consisting of the 27th Light, 94th Line, and 95th Line Infantry Regiments. General of Division Jean Baptiste Eblé led four-foot and two horse artillery batteries, a total of 36 guns. General of Brigade Jacques Louis François Delaistre de Tilly led the corps cavalry, the 2nd and 4th Hussar and 5th Chasseurs à Cheval Regiments. Sahuc's attached division included General of Brigade Pierre Margaron's 17th and 27th Dragoon Regiments and Laplanche's 18th and 19th Dragoon Regiments.

Markov sent one infantry regiment forward to the hamlet of Pfarrersfeldchen, with the Elisabethgrad Hussars out front. He placed his main line on some high ground south of Georgenthal (Jurki), with two infantry regiments in the front line and one regiment in a second line. Three battalions of jägers held Georgenthal while two more battalions guarded the west flank.

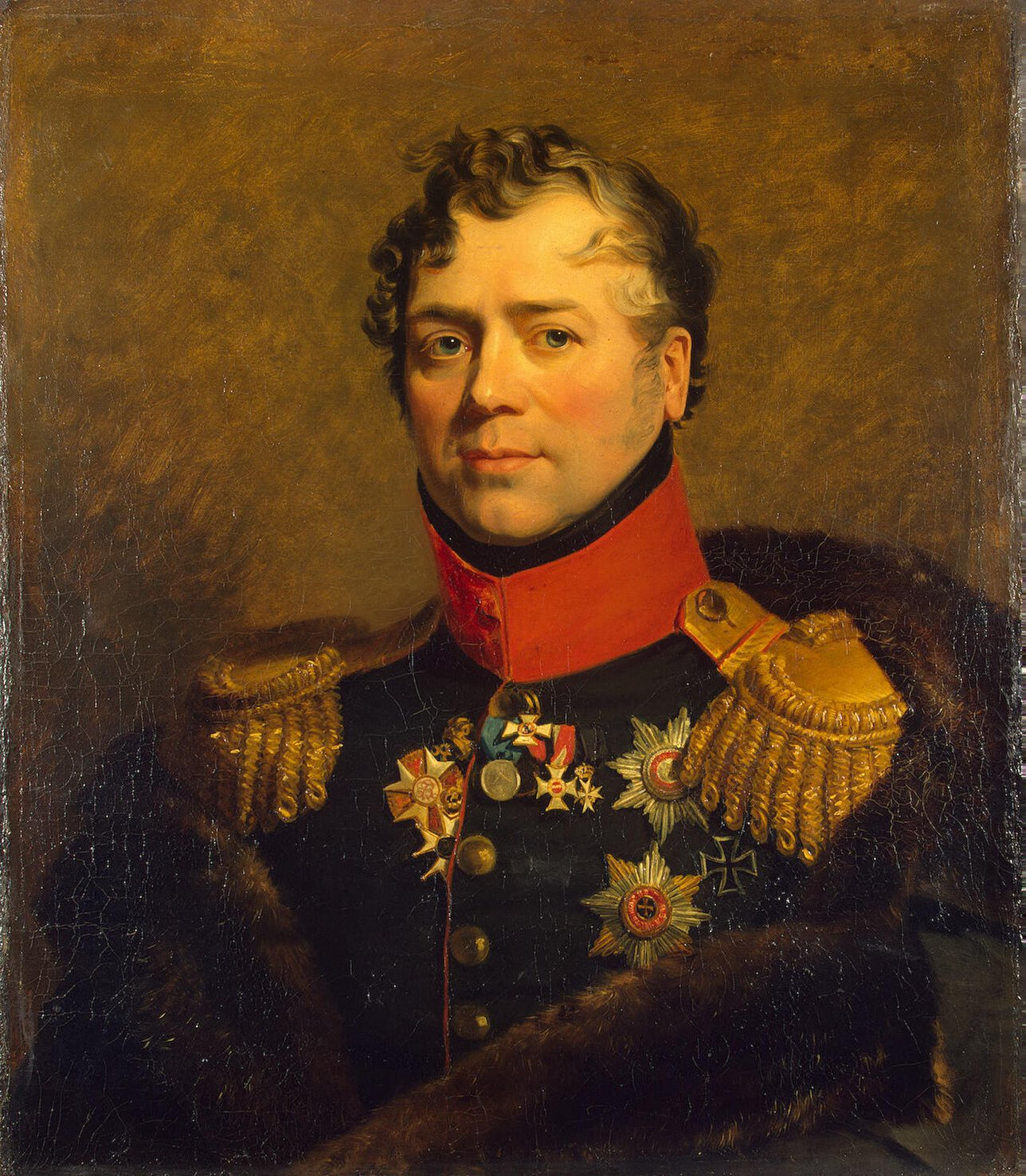
Dmitry Golitsyn

Bernadotte's cavalry attacked the Russian hussars about 1:00 PM. The hussars drove back their opponents and pursued them, but came upon the French artillery and were driven off. The French horsemen chased the Russians until, they were also stopped by enemy artillery fire. Posting four field pieces on a hill to provide fire support, Bernadotte sent one battalion of the 9th Light Infantry Regiment in a frontal assault on Pfarrersfeldchen, while the 1st battalion of the 27th Light Infantry Regiment attacked a forested area to the east. The 9th was repulsed, so Bernadotte threw in the 2nd battalion of the 27th and the 8th Light Infantry Regiment. The 94th Line Infantry Regiment and the dragoons waited in support. The 1st battalion of the 27th briefly lost its eagle before recapturing it. The attack succeeded in clearing the Russian regiment out of Pfarrersfeldchen.

Markov was forced to deploy six battalions to cover his right flank against Dupont's threatening advance. Meanwhile, Bernadotte attacked in front as it began to get dark. Despite tough fighting, Dupont's flank attack began to make headway and Markov ordered a withdrawal. Around this time, General Anrep arrived and announced that cavalry reinforcements were coming. He was soon hit and carried off, fatally wounded. As they pulled back, the Russians resisted fiercely. Nevertheless, Dupont drove off the two regiments in his front and closed in on Georgenthal.

Suddenly, Bernadotte heard firing in his rear at Mohrungen. He immediately called off the battle and retraced his steps toward the town. What had happened was that Russian cavalry reached the town from the east. Golitsyn, leading the cavalry of the left wing, reached the village of Alt Reichau (Boguchwały), east of Mohrungen. Though he could not hear the battle because of an acoustical quirk, he wanted to scout the territory to the west. From Alt Reichau, he sent three squadrons of cavalry under Peter Dolgorukov, followed by six more squadrons under Peter Petrovich Pahlen, through the gap between Lake Narie (Narien) and Lake Marąg (Mahrung). The Russian horsemen entered Mohrungen as night fell, capturing the few defenders and pillaging the baggage trains that they found in the town.

Trying to exploit their success, Dolgorukov and Pahlen moved north where they bumped into Bernadotte's returning troops and quickly retreated. Except for a body of cavalry which the French surrounded and captured, the Russian raiders got away with 360 French prisoners, 200 liberated Russian and Prussian prisoners, and some of their loot. Silver plate from petty German states and 12,500 ducats extorted from the town of Elbing (Elbląg) were allegedly found in Bernadotte's personal baggage, Bernadotte denied the accusation and the incident was never substantiated and was contrary to Bernadotte's reputation for probity as one of the few French Marshals who refrained from looting and protected civilian populations from the exactions common of the time. Of the event, Bernadotte was said to be chagrined and that the capture of his baggage would not allow him to distribute his habitual rewards to his troops.

== Results ==
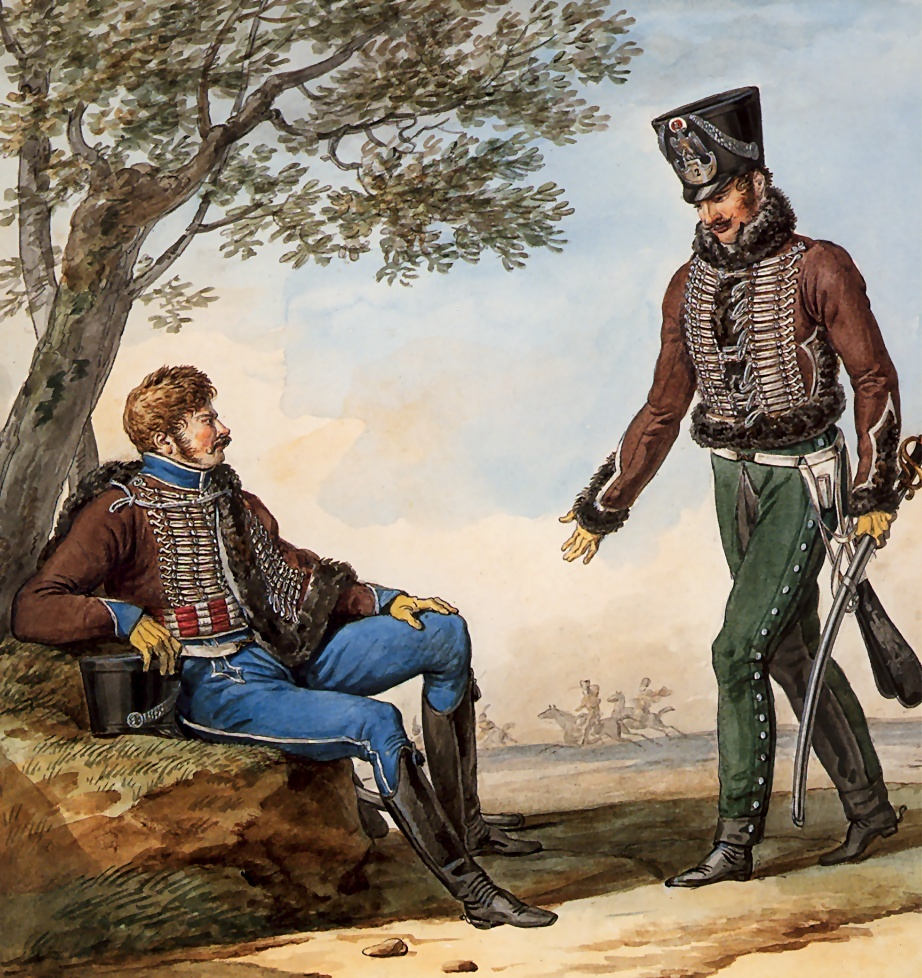
French 2nd Hussars, I Corps

According to a historian Digby Smith, the French suffered losses of 696 killed and wounded, while 400 were made prisoner. The Russian killed and wounded numbered 1,100, with 300 more being captured. Russian General Anrep lost his life. He was replaced in command of the 14th Division by Lieutenant General Nikolay Kamensky, son of the former commander of the army. Francis Loraine Petre estimates losses as high as 2,000 on each side. Bernadotte reported losing 700 or 800 troops while inflicting 1,600 casualties on his enemies.

The next day, Bernadotte retreated south to Liebemühl (Miłomłyn), leaving Mohrungen to be occupied by Bennigsen's troops. Markov followed up the French toward Liebemühl, while Baggovut's left advance guard seized Allenstein (Olsztyn). At Mohrungen on the 28th, Bennigsen called a halt to operations so that his tired troops could rest. Bernadotte continued withdrawing to the south until he reached Löbau (Lubawa) where he joined General of Division Jean-Joseph Ange d'Hautpoul's 2nd Cuirassier Division. This gave him 17,000 infantry and over 5,000 cavalry.

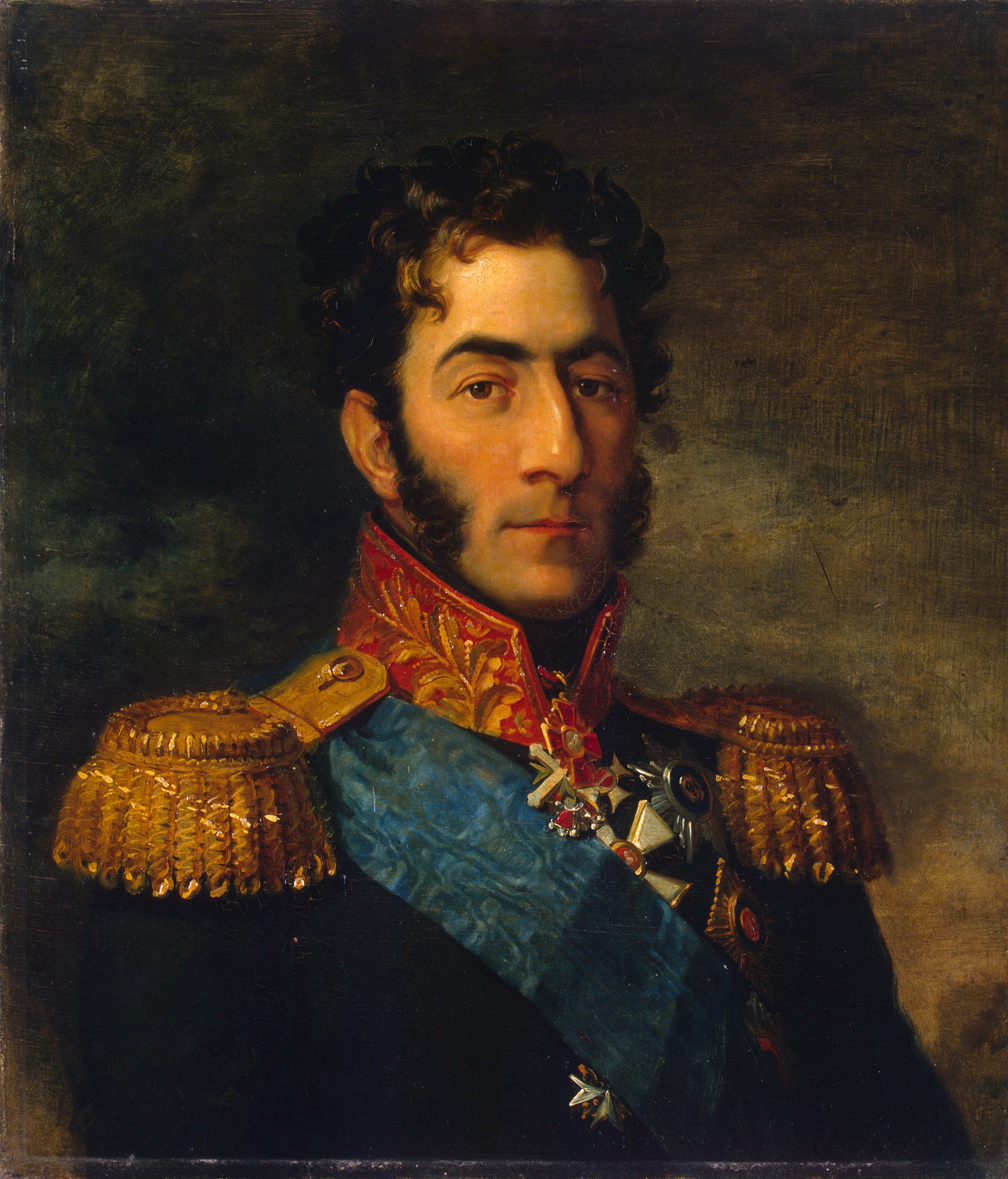
Pyotr Bagration

The 4,500-man Prussian garrison of Graudenz (Grudziądz), under General of Infantry Wilhelm René de l'Homme de Courbière, had been besieged by General of Division Marie François Rouyer and a force of Hessians. At L'Estocq's approach, Rouyer raised the siege, allowing the Prussians to restock the garrison's food supplies on 31 January. This timely intervention allowed the garrison to resist the enemy besiegers until the end of the war. A Russian advance guard under General Pyotr Bagration linked L'Estocq and Bennigsen's main force, which was centered on Mohrungen, facing south.

Pleased with his success so far, and expecting Napoleon to retreat to the west bank of the Vistula, Bennigsen was in for a surprise. Far from retreating, the French emperor launched a dangerous counterattack on 1 February. Napoleon saw that Bennigsen had advanced so far west that there was an opportunity to hit the Russian army in the left flank and rear. He ordered Bernadotte to continue retreating to tempt Bennigsen to move westward into the trap. Lannes with the V Corps and General of Division Nicolas Léonard Beker's dragoon division would keep an eye on Ivan Essen's detached force to the northeast of Warsaw. (These forces clashed in the Battle of Ostrołęka on 16 February.) Napoleon ordered the corps of Davout, Soult, Augereau, Murat, and the Imperial Guard northward to Allenstein, while Ney covered the gap between the main body and Bernadotte.

On 1 February, the Russian commander enjoyed a great stroke of good luck. The orders to Bernadotte were given to an officer fresh from the military academy. This hapless individual, ignorant of the area, rode straight into a band of cossacks and was unable to destroy his dispatch. Soon, Bagration came into possession of the important document, which he forwarded to his army commander. As soon as he received the news, Bennigsen ordered the army to rapidly retreat on Jonkowo. As it happened, seven other couriers also fell into the hands of the cossacks, so Bernadotte remained in total ignorance of the plan until 3 February and missed the Battle of Eylau, which occurred on 7 and 8 February. In the meantime, the advancing French and the retreating Prussians and Russians fought a series of clashes at Bergfried (Berkweda) on 3 February, at Waltersdorf (Wilczkowo) on 5 February, and at Hof (Dwórzno) on 6 February.

== Notes ==
Preceded by Battle of Pułtusk (1806)	Napoleonic Wars; Battle of Mohrungen	Succeeded by Battle of Eylau
