= Mały Horn =

- Village
- Location within Poland
- Coordinates: 53°53′N 20°1′E
- Country: Poland
- Voivodeship: Warmian-Masurian
- County: Ostróda
- Gmina: Morąg
- Population: approx. 20

Mały Horn [ˈmavɨ ˈxɔrn] (literally "Little Horn") is located in the administrative district of Gmina Morąg, within Ostróda County, Warmian-Masurian Voivodeship, in northern Poland. It is officially a part of the village of Żabi Róg two kilometers to the south, but is considered a separate village by the families who live there, who are generally much more wealthy than their neighbors to the south. Mały Horn lies on the southern tip or "horn" of Lake Narie, near the village of Kretowiny. It consists of a few farms, a "sawmill", and two large homes which are often used as bed & breakfast facilities for visitors to the lake.
