= Maliniak =

Maliniak may refer to:

== Places ==
- Maliniak, Ostróda County, a village in northern Poland
- Maliniak, Szczytno County, a village in northern Poland

== Other ==
- Maliniak, Polish mead flavored with raspberry juice
- Arie Maliniak (born 1949), Israeli basketball player, coach and journalist
