= Niebrzydowo =

Niebrzydowo may refer to the following places in Poland:

- Niebrzydowo Małe
- Niebrzydowo Wielkie
