= Żabi Róg =

- Village
- Location within Poland
- Coordinates: 53°53′N 20°1′E
- Country: Poland
- Voivodeship: Warmian-Masurian
- County: Ostróda
- Gmina: Morąg
- Population: 1,220

Żabi Róg [ˈʐabi ˈruk] (literally "Frog's Corner/Frog's Horn") is a village in the administrative district of Gmina Morąg, within Ostróda County, Warmian-Masurian Voivodeship, in northern Poland.

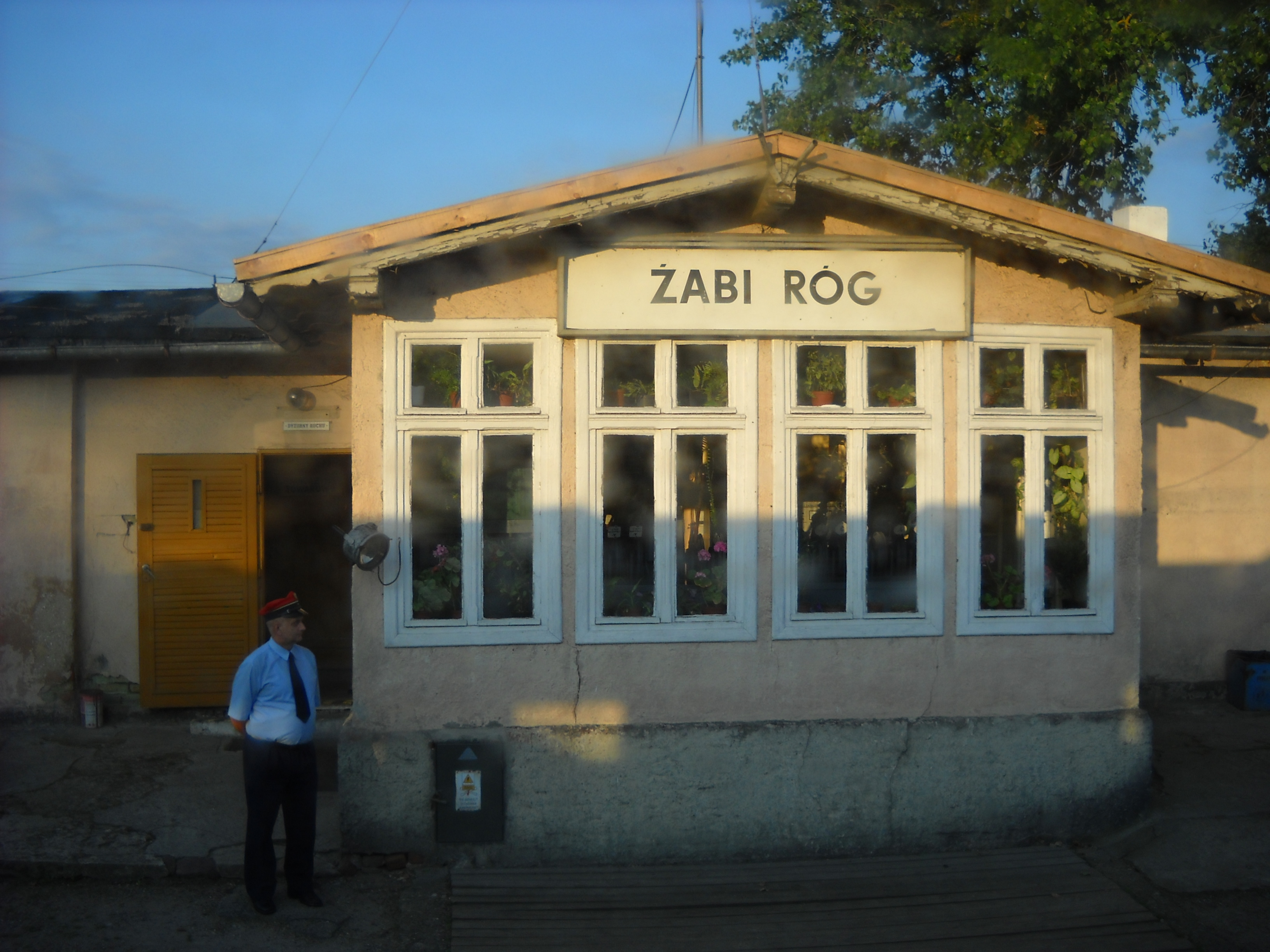
Rail station in Żabi Róg

The village lies midway between Lake Morąg and Lake Narie. The village center is made up of three small shops, a small post office, and two pubs. Local industry consists primarily of small farms devoted to hops, wheat and barley which are sold to nearby breweries. Many farmers also keep a few dairy cattle, and there is a sizable chicken farm on the north side of the village. Lumber also brings income to the village, which is in the heavily wooded Mazury region. Many villagers are engaged in felling trees which are sent two kilometers north to Mały Horn to be cut into boards at the "sawmill" there, which is operated by a father and son and consists of a single saw driven by a belt attached to a diesel motor, and sent back to a small woodworking company which employs a few dozen young men who make wooden crates, pallets, and small consumer items. Fishing also contributes to the community; the many nearby lakes and ponds are rich in Pike (Esocidae), Crayfish (Astacus astacus) and Eel (Anguilla anguilla). Though only licensed fisherman may legally catch the endangered eel, a Polish delicacy, some locals enjoy making midnight canoe trips to haul in their catch from lines, weighted with bricks and baited every meter or so, which rest on the lake bottom. Hunting is also popular; the area is home to many deer and boar (Sus scrofa).

There is no school in Żabi Róg. School children walk about a kilometer every day to a stop on the rail line and travel by train to Morąg, approximately eight kilometres (4 mi.) to the northwest.
