= Battle of Obuchowo =

Date	26 September 1920
Location	Region of Obuchowo
Result	Polish victory

Belligerents
Second Polish Republic	Russian SFSR

Casualties and losses
30 killed, 175 wounded and POWs	700 killed, 1 gun, 3 rifles, 50 stock wagons

The Battle of Obuchowo took place on 26 September 1920, during the Polish–Soviet War. Polish 4th Podhale Rifles Regiment, commanded by Colonel Mieczysław Boruta-Spiechowicz, clashed with subunits of Red Army's 5th, 6th and 56th Rifle Divisions. The battle, which took place in the village of Obuchowo, located near Grodno, is regarded as part of the much larger Battle of the Niemen River.

During the Battle of the Niemen, Polish 21st Mountain Infantry Division, which at that time was commanded by General Andrzej Galica, and was part of Second Army (General Edward Rydz-Śmigły), was ordered to capture Indura (25 km south of Grodno), together with the Niemen river bridge at Komatowo. 2nd Mountain Brigade was tasked with this, but its advance was slow due to the stubbornness of the enemy. By evening of 23 September, Poles captured Dubow, and on the next day, at 4 a.m., two Polish battalions, supported by artillery, began their attack.

The hills near Indura were defended by Soviet 5th Rifle Division, which several times counterattacked trying to halt the advancing Poles. After a whole day of fighting, Polish battalions captured Indura at app. 10 p.m.

On 25 September, Boruta-Spiechowicz was ordered to continue march towards Komatów. At 5 p.m. on that day, 2nd Battalion of Major Kostecki reached the Niemen river, but the bridge was already burning, as Soviet soldiers had set it on fire. Since Polish units did not have the pontoons, they had to wait. The pontoons finally arrived at midnight, and the river was crossed before 3 a.m. without any problems, as the enemy most likely failed to notice Polish movements.

By 3 a.m., the Battalion of Major Kostecki reached Obuchowo. The village was defended by Soviet 48th Rifle Regiment, accompanied by a company of sappers. The Poles took the enemy by surprise, and after a short fight, captured Obuchowo. While chasing the retreating Soviets, the Poles encountered military transports of 6th and 56th Rifle Divisions, which had fled from Grodno, and captured 50 wagons, together with 300 soldiers.

After finding out from Soviet prisoners that 6th and 56th Rifle Divisions had divided into two columns, and headed towards Skidel, Boruta-Spiechowicz decided to cut their roads of retreat. Polish 2nd Battalion was sent to Hill 134 near Zydomla, 1st Battalion manned Hill 154 near Obuchowo, and 3rd Battalion remained in reserve at Obuchowo.

While marching to their positions, 1st and 3rd Battalions were attacked by 56th Rifle Brigade. 2nd Battalion was forced to retreat after a fierce attack of 6th Rifle Division, supported by cavalry. Polish soldiers defended their positions with bayonets and hand grenades. Their losses were very heavy, including Major Kostecki himself, who was twice wounded and then captured by the enemy. Under the circumstances, Boruta-Spiechowicz rallied a number of soldiers and personally led a counterattack, which temporarily halted the Soviets. The enemy then concentrated its main forces north and east of Obuchowo, planning to capture the Niemen crossing at Komatow, and to cut off Polish regiment.

At 2 p.m., on 26 September, 3rd Podhale Rifle Regiment appeared with support. Under its pressure, the Soviets retreated. Exhausted Polish soldiers failed to destroy Soviet units, but the enemy suffered substantial losses, and delayed its retreat by several hours.

Altogether, the Poles lost 300 KIA, and 175 WIA / MIA. Soviet losses are unknown, but during the battle, the Poles took 700 prisoners, 3 heavy machine guns and 50 wagons with goods.

The Battle of Obuchowo is commemorated on the Tomb of the Unknown Soldier, Warsaw, with the inscription "GRODNO - OBUCHOWO 20 - 25 IX 1920".

== Sources ==
- J. Odziemkowski, Leksykon wojny polsko-rosyjskiej 1919 - 1920, wyd. RYTM Warszawa 2004.
