= Woryty Morąskie =

- Settlement
- Location within Poland
- Coordinates: 53°56′02″N 19°59′00″E
- Country: Poland
- Voivodeship: Warmian-Masurian
- County: Ostróda
- Gmina: Morąg
- Time zone: UTC+1 (CET)
  - Summer (DST): UTC+2 (CEST)
- Vehicle registration: NOS

Woryty Morąskie [vɔˈrɨtɨ mɔˈrɔ̃skʲɛ] is a settlement in the administrative district of Gmina Morąg, within Ostróda County, Warmian-Masurian Voivodeship, in northern Poland. It is situated on the north-western shore of Narie Lake in the region of Powiśle.

The Żmijewski Polish noble family lived in the village.
