= Wenecja =

Wenecja is the Polish name for the city of Venice, Italy. It may also refer to the following places in Poland:

- Wenecja, Kuyavian-Pomeranian Voivodeship
- Wenecja, Warmian-Masurian Voivodeship
- Wenecja, 2010 film directed by Jan Jakub Kolski
