= Mahorn =

Mahorn is a surname. Notable people with the surname include:

- Atlee Mahorn (born 1965), three-time Canadian Olympic sprinter
- Dwayne Mahorn (born 1981), English Rap and Grime MC sometimes known as Durrty Doogz, from London
- Paul Mahorn (born 1973), English former football forward
- Rick Mahorn (born 1958), American retired NBA basketball player who, at 6'10", played power forward and center

== See also ==
- Mahoran (disambiguation)
- Marchhorn
- Mały Horn
