= Jurecki =

Jurecki (feminine: Jurecka; plural: Jureccy) is a Polish surname. Notable people with the name include:

- Bartosz Jurecki (born 1979), Polish handball player
- Marcin Jurecki (1976–2008), Polish wrestler
- Michał Jurecki (born 1984), Polish handball player
- Mieczysław Jurecki (born 1956), Polish musician

== See also ==
- Jurecki Młyn, a settlement in the administrative district of Gmina Morąg in northern Poland
