= Anin =

Anin may refer to the following places in Poland:

- Anin, Warsaw
- Anin, Warmian-Masurian Voivodeship
- Anin, West Pomeranian Voivodeship

== See also ==
Anin (surname)
