= Pilag =

Pilag may refer to:

- Piłąg, Poland
- Pilehgah, Iran
