= Wilnowo =

- Village
- Location within Poland
- Coordinates: 53°55′N 20°4′E
- Country: Poland
- Voivodeship: Warmian-Masurian
- County: Ostróda
- Gmina: Morąg

Wilnowo [vilˈnɔvɔ] (German Willnau) is a village in the administrative district of Gmina Morąg, within Ostróda County, Warmian-Masurian Voivodeship, in northern Poland.
