= Prętki, Ostróda County =

Prętki
- Settlement
- Location within Poland
- Coordinates: 53°59′39″N 19°48′43″E
- Country: Poland
- Voivodeship: Warmian-Masurian
- County: Ostróda
- Gmina: Morąg

Prętki [ˈprɛntki] is a settlement in the administrative district of Gmina Morąg, within Ostróda County, Warmian-Masurian Voivodeship, in northern Poland.
