= Bramka, Warmian-Masurian Voivodeship =

Bramka
- Village
- Location within Poland
- Coordinates: 53°52′N 19°57′E
- Country: Poland
- Voivodeship: Warmian-Masurian
- County: Ostróda
- Gmina: Morąg

Bramka [ˈbramka] is a village in the administrative district of Gmina Morąg, within Ostróda County, Warmian-Masurian Voivodeship, in northern Poland.
