= Prośno =

- Village
- Location within Poland
- Coordinates: 53°49′5″N 19°56′2″E
- Country: Poland
- Voivodeship: Warmian-Masurian
- County: Ostróda
- Gmina: Morąg

Prośno (Polish pronunciation: [ˈprɔɕnɔ]; German: Pörschkenis) a village in the administrative district of Gmina Morąg, within Ostróda County, Warmian-Masurian Voivodeship, in northern Poland.
