= Tątławki =

- Village
- Location within Poland
- Coordinates: 53°54′N 20°5′E
- Country: Poland
- Voivodeship: Warmian-Masurian
- County: Ostróda
- Gmina: Morąg

Tątławki [tɔnˈtwafki] is a village in the administrative district of Gmina Morąg, within Ostróda County, Warmian-Masurian Voivodeship, in northern Poland.
