= Rogowo, Gmina Morąg =

Rogowo
- Settlement
- Location within Poland
- Coordinates: 53°54′00″N 20°05′00″E
- Country: Poland
- Voivodeship: Warmian-Masurian
- County: Ostróda
- Gmina: Morąg
- Time zone: UTC+01:00 (CET)
  - Summer (DST): UTC+02:00 (CEST)

Rogowo [rɔˈɡɔvɔ] is a settlement in the administrative district of Gmina Morąg, within Ostróda County, Warmian-Masurian Voivodeship, in northern Poland.
