= Anin (surname) =

Anin is a surname. Notable people with the surname include:

- Ante Anin (born 3 February 1966), German architect
- Kévin Anin (born 5 July 1986), French former professional footballer
- Lucy Anin (born 13 June 1939), Ghanaian politician
- Roman Anin (born 16 December 1986), Russian investigative journalist
- T. E. Anin, Ghanaian lawyer

== See also ==
Anin (disambiguation)
