= Białka, Gmina Morąg =

Białka
- Settlement
- Location within Poland
- Coordinates: 53°49′41″N 19°58′12″E
- Country: Poland
- Voivodeship: Warmian-Masurian
- County: Ostróda
- Gmina: Morąg

Białka [ˈbjau̯ka] is a settlement in the administrative district of Gmina Morąg, within Ostróda County, Warmian-Masurian Voivodeship, in northern Poland.
