= Zawroty, Warmian-Masurian Voivodeship =

Zawroty
- Village
- Location within Poland
- Coordinates: 53°51′N 19°59′E
- Country: Poland
- Voivodeship: Warmian-Masurian
- County: Ostróda
- Gmina: Morąg

Zawroty [zaˈvrɔtɨ] (German Schwenkendorf) is a village in the administrative district of Gmina Morąg, within Ostróda County, Warmian-Masurian Voivodeship, in northern Poland.
