= Słonecznik, Ostróda County =

Słonecznik
- Village
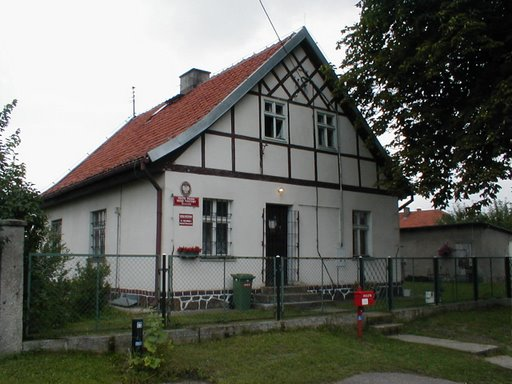

- Location within Poland
- Coordinates: 53°51′N 19°53′E
- Country: Poland
- Voivodeship: Warmian-Masurian
- County: Ostróda
- Gmina: Morąg
- Population (approx.): 1,000

Słonecznik [swɔˈnɛt͡ʂnik] is a village in the administrative district of Gmina Morąg, within Ostróda County, Warmian-Masurian Voivodeship, in northern Poland.
