= Morąg =

Town in Warmian-Masurian Voivodeship, Poland

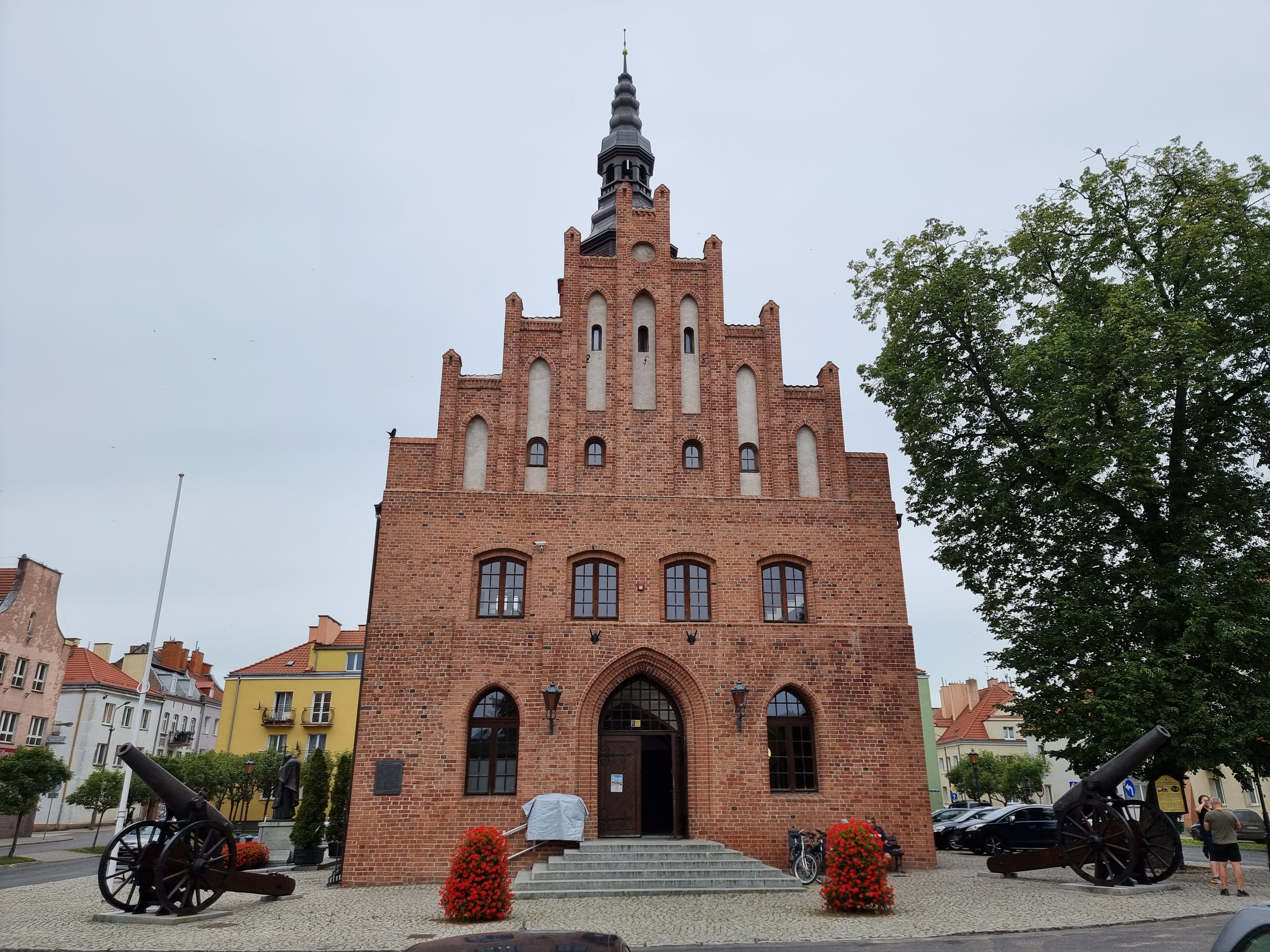
- Town hall

- Flag Coat of arms

- Location within Poland
- Coordinates: 53°55′N 19°56′E
- Country: Poland
- Voivodeship: Warmian-Masurian
- County: Ostróda
- Gmina: Morąg
- Established: 13th century
- Town rights: 1327

Government
  - Mayor: Tomasz Orłowski

Area
  - Total: 12.17 km^{2} (4.70 sq mi)

Population (2006)
  - Total: 14,497
  - Density: 1,191/km^{2} (3,085/sq mi)
- Time zone: UTC+1 (CET)
  - Summer (DST): UTC+2 (CEST)
- Postal code: 14-300, 14-331
- Area code: +48 89
- Car plates: NOS
- Website: http://www.morag.pl

Morąg (Polish pronunciation: [ˈmɔrɔŋk]; German: Mohrungen, [ˈmoːʁʊŋən]) is a town in northern Poland, Ostróda County in the Warmian–Masurian Voivodeship. It is the seat of Gmina Morąg.

== Geography ==
The town is situated in the western uplands of the historic Prussia region and the Powiśle region. Its centre is located about 60 km (37 mi) south of the Polish–Russian (Kaliningrad) border. The nearest city is Olsztyn in Warmia, 38 km (24 mi) to the southeast.

== History ==
=== Middle Ages ===
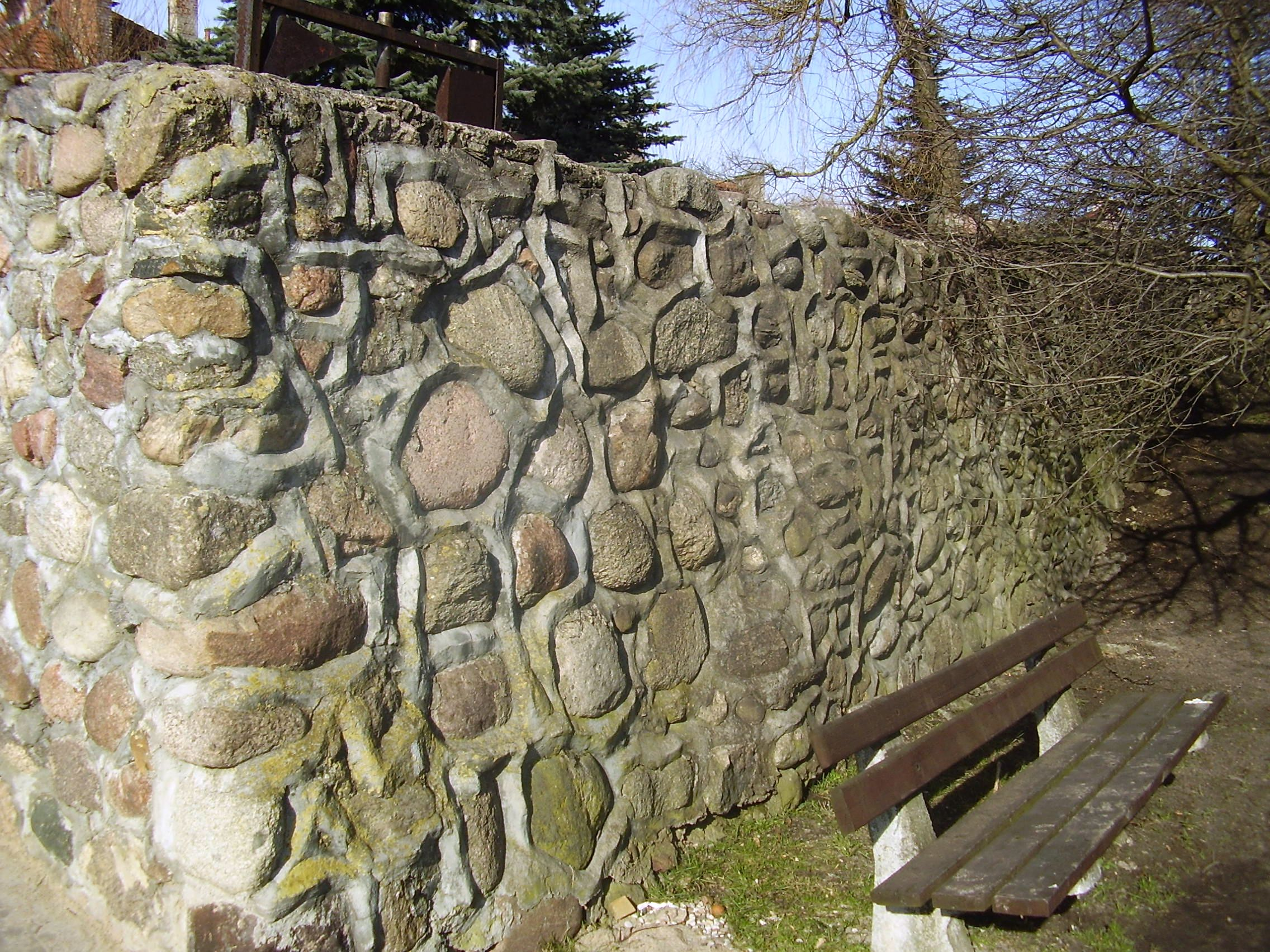
Medieval town walls

In medieval times, an Old Prussian settlement existed at the site under the name of Mawrin, Maurin or Morin. A new town was built on its place by the invading Teutonic Knights after they destroyed the original settlement in the late 13th century. Part of the Order's State, it was given the name Mohrungen after a nearby lake and in 1327 attained Kulm town law from the local commander (Komtur) Hermann von Oettingen. The first inhabitants of the town were emigrants from the southern Harz region in central Germany.

After the 1410 Battle of Grunwald the victorious Polish-Lithuanian army took over the town and the castle without a fight. During the Polish–Teutonic Hunger War of 1414, Mohrungen incinerated completely. In 1440, the town joined the anti-Teutonic Prussian Confederation, at the request of which King Casimir IV Jagiellon signed the act of incorporation of the region to the Kingdom of Poland in 1454. At the start of the subsequent Thirteen Years' War, the citizens sided with Poland, and on 11 June 1454 in Elbing (Elbląg), the town pledged allegiance to the Polish King. The town fought against the Teutonic Order in the war from 1454 to 1466. Reconquered by the Elbing commander Heinrich Reuß von Plauen in 1461, the town became his seat as deputy Grand Master. The command of the town was given to Ertman von Kirchberg, who oppressed the inhabitants. After the peace treaty signed in Toruń in 1466, the town became a part of Poland as a fief held by the Teutonic Knights.

Mohrungen was on a shipping commerce line connecting Truso with harbors at the Black Sea. Agriculture and commerce was the primary occupations in the town. It was known as a cattle and grain market.

=== Modern era ===
During the Polish–Teutonic War of 1519–21, Morąg was again captured by Poland in 1520, after the local commander, Czech mercenary Wurgel Drahnicky, who wanted to defend the castle, was forced to submit to the Poles by the townspeople and his own troops. Upon the Protestant Reformation and the secularisation of the Order's State in 1525 it became part of Ducal Prussia, remaining a Polish fief until 1657. The estates were held by Colonel Peter von Dohna (1483–1553), Lord of Schlobitten, whose son Achatius von Dohna (1533–1619) had a castle erected. Peter's grandson Christopher von Dohna (1583–1637) became known as a scholar and governor of the Principality of Orange during the Thirty Years' War. Rebuilt in a Baroque style in the early 18th century, Dohna Palace is today used as a museum.

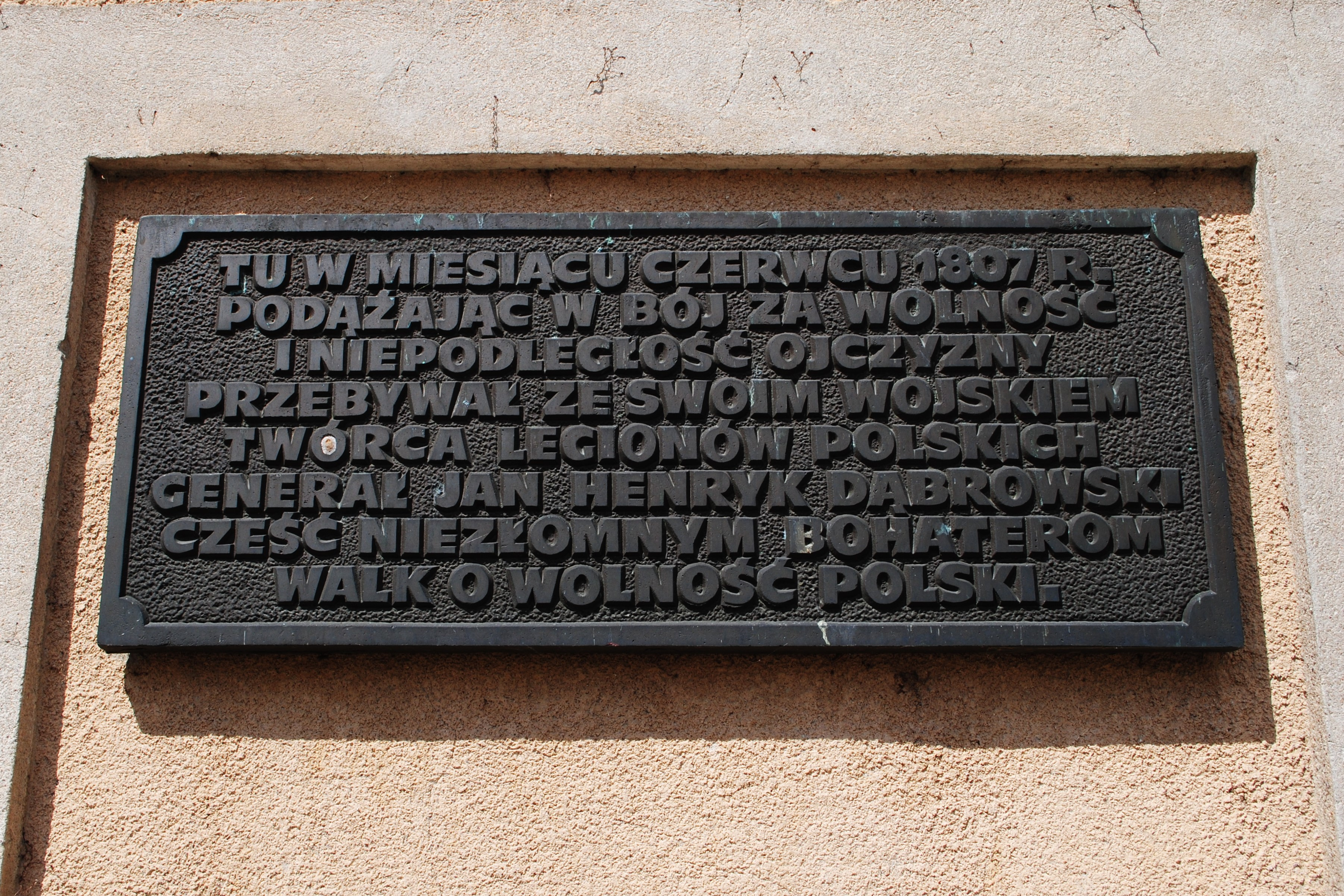
Plaque commemorating the stay of Jan Henryk Dąbrowski in 1807

Mohrungen was again devastated during the Polish–Swedish War in 1626. From 1701 it was part of the Kingdom of Prussia under King Frederick I. It remained the seat of the local administration, since 1752 of Landkreis Mohrungen (Morąg district). Despite being outside of Polish suzerainty since 1657, in the 18th century Poles still inhabited the town and its surroundings, and the town owed its prosperity to trade routes connecting with Poland. The town was within short distances surrounded by Polish territory. During the Napoleonic War of the Fourth Coalition, in 1807, Marshal Jean-Baptiste Jules Bernadotte, the future King of Sweden and Norway, took his residence at Dohna Palace; his French forces defeated the advance guard of Levin von Bennigsen's Russian Army at the Battle of Mohrungen on 25 January 1807. On 9–10 June 1807 the Polish division of General Jan Henryk Dąbrowski stayed in the town. An earthquake struck the town in 1818.

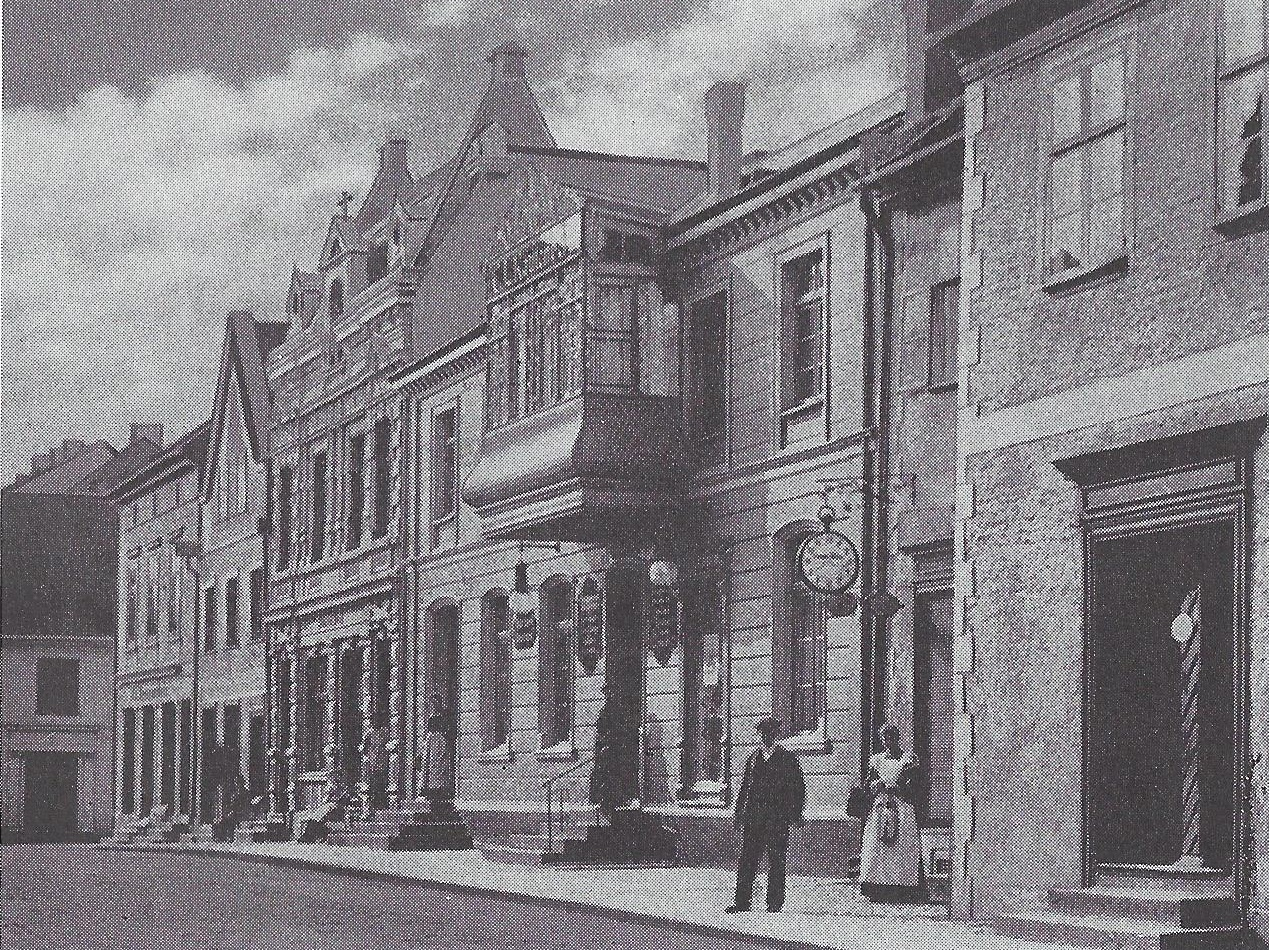
Early 20th-century view of the town

The town was connected to the Prussian state railways network in 1882. Located in the East Prussian Königsberg region, Mohrungen remained part of Germany from 1871 until 1945. During World War II, some Poles expelled from Mazovia were subjected to forced labour in the town's vicinity. The town was captured by Soviet Red Army forces of the 2nd Belorussian Front during the East Prussian Offensive on 23 January 1945. After the war, the remaining German population was expelled, and the town was incorporated into the re-established Poland according to the Potsdam Agreement, regaining its historic Polish name, Morąg.

A garrison of the Polish Army was located in the town.

From May 2010 to 2011 the town was the garrison of a United States Army Patriot Missile defense battery.

Morąg is a member of Cittaslow.

== Sights ==
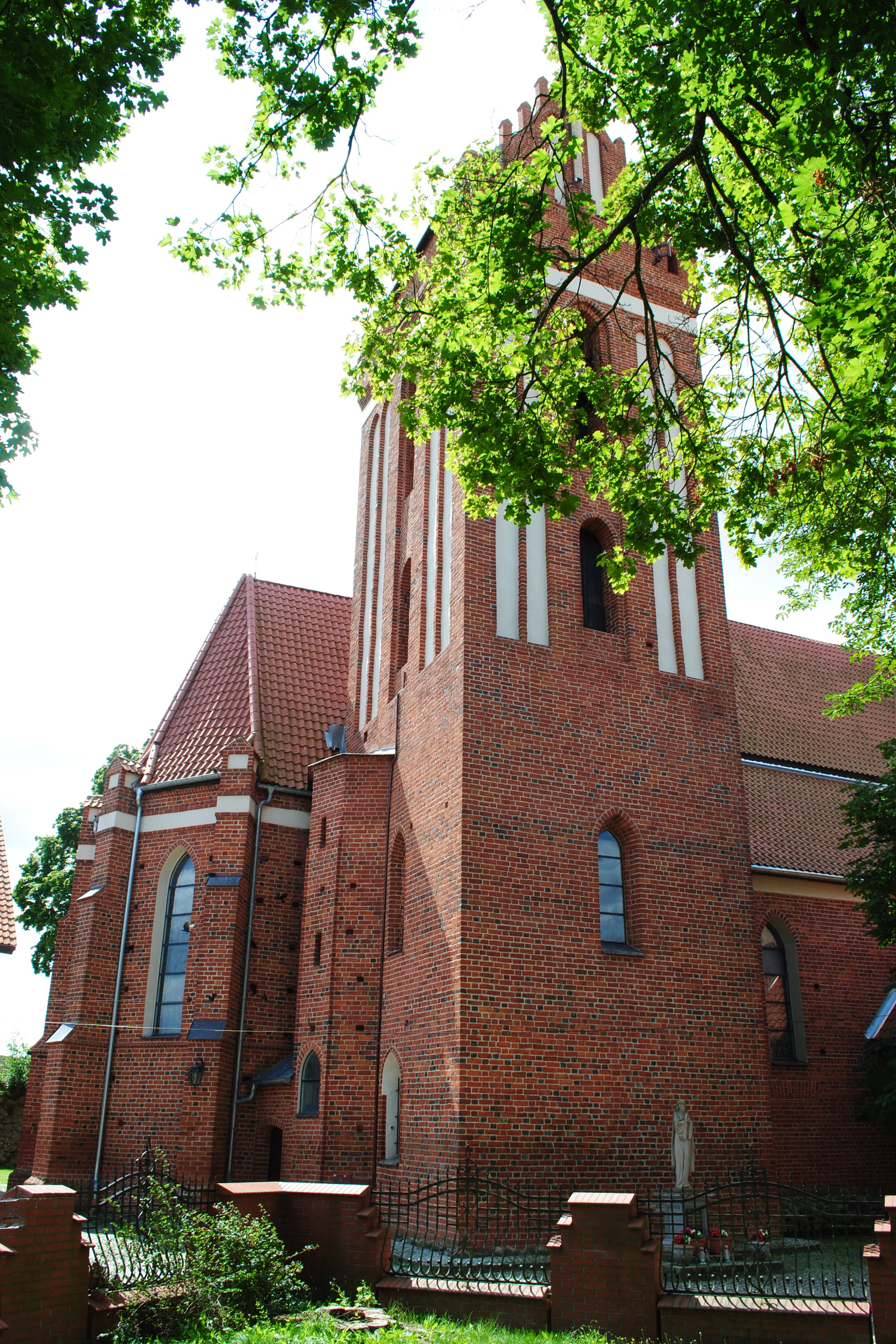
St. Peter and St Paul's church

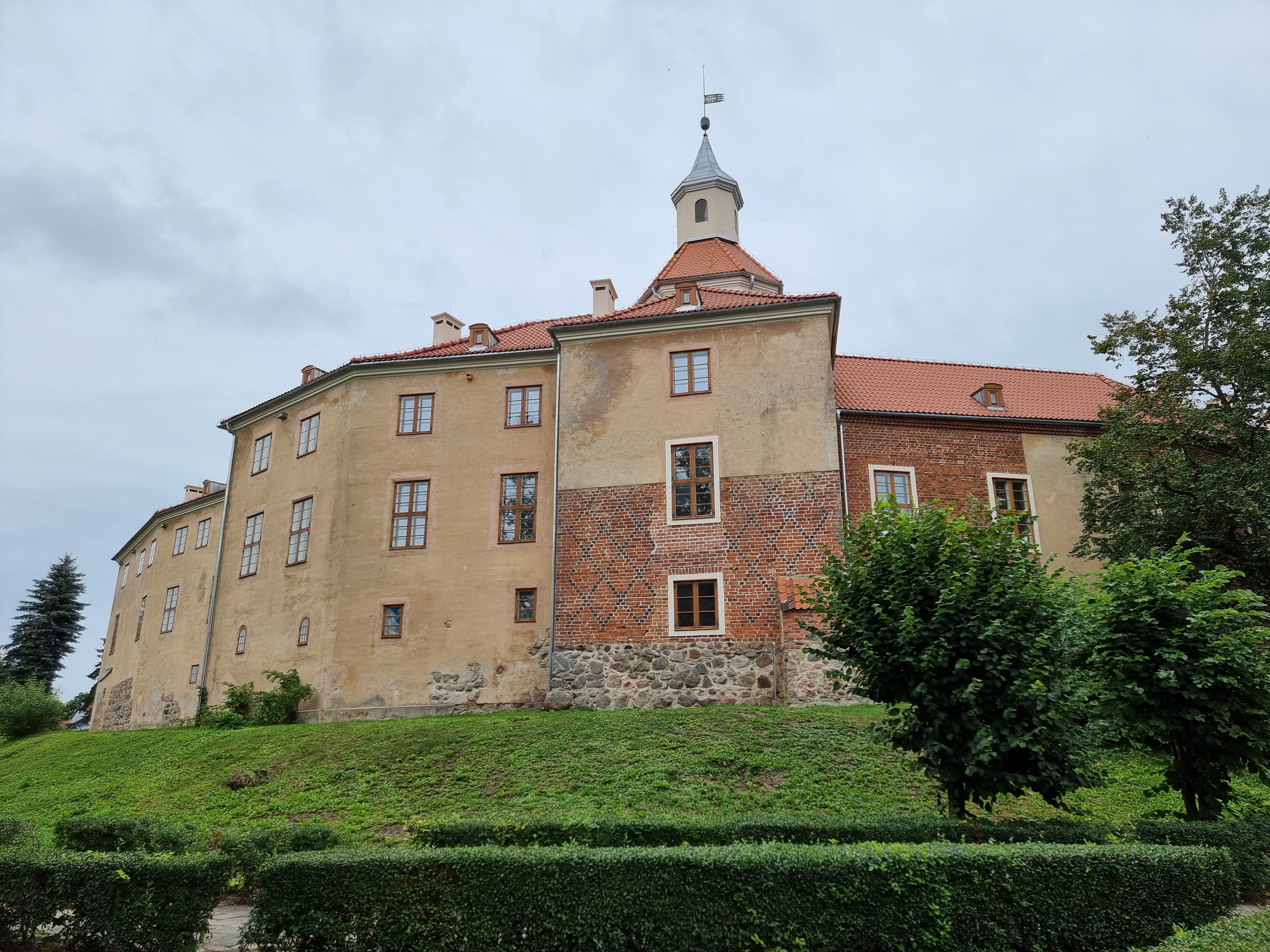
Dohna Palace, now museum

After a fire in 1697 only Dohna Palace and the parish church, which was restored and rebuilt several times, survived. Following World War II in 1945 fires burnt about 45% of the historic town centre. Only the outer walls of the town hall remained.

- The old castle of the Teutonic Knights is being excavated as more of it has been recently discovered.
- The Dohna Palace, which was mostly destroyed in the Second World War, was restored in 1986. Now it houses the Museum of Johann Gottfried Herder, an impressive regional museum.
- The main body of the Catholic church of Saint Peter and Saint Paul goes back to the first half of the 14th century.
- The town hall, damaged in the Second World War, was rebuilt from 1947-1954 as it looked before.
- Some ruins of the original town walls still remain.
- Kretowiny, a popular lake and camp ground are only 9 km (6 mi) away and are a favorite and frequent retreat for the local population.

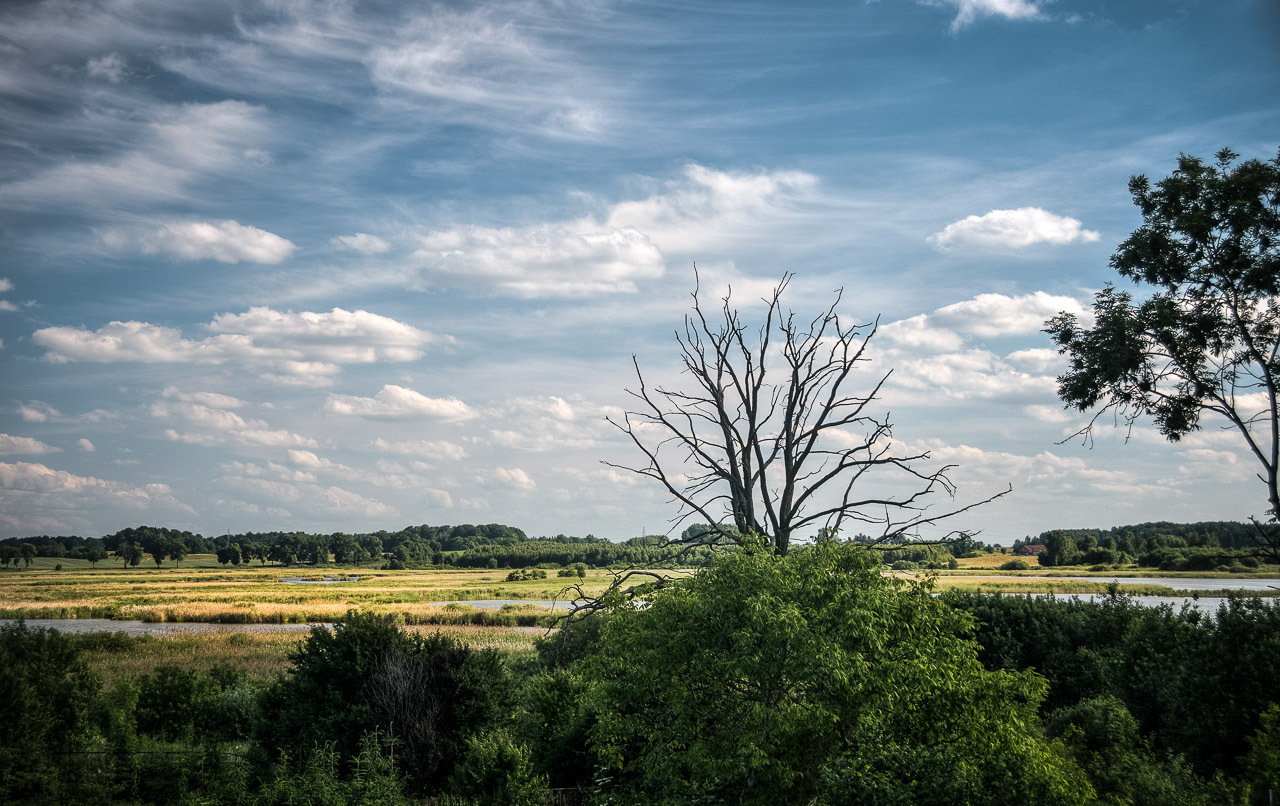
Morąg Marsh

== Population ==
Historical population

| Year | Pop. | ±% |
|---|---|---|
| 1740 | 1,067 | — |
| 1782 | 1,753 | +64.3% |
| 1820 | 2,108 | +20.3% |
| 1843 | 2,770 | +31.4% |
| 1856 | 3,407 | +23.0% |
| 1880 | 3,633 | +6.6% |
| 1885 | 3,922 | +8.0% |

| Year | Pop. | ±% |
|---|---|---|
| 1890 | 3,776 | −3.7% |
| 1900 | 4,025 | +6.6% |
| 1910 | 4,147 | +3.0% |
| 1925 | 4,934 | +19.0% |
| 1933 | 5,422 | +9.9% |
| 1950 | 5,702 | +5.2% |
| 1960 | 8,303 | +45.6% |

| Year | Pop. | ±% |
|---|---|---|
| 1978 | 11,452 | +37.9% |
| 1988 | 14,213 | +24.1% |
| 2003 | 14,570 | +2.5% |
| 2010 | 13,895 | −4.6% |
| 2017 | 14,042 | +1.1% |

== Transport ==
Voivodeship roads 519 (Stary Dzierzgoń, Zalewo, Małdyty, Morąg), 527 (Dzierzgoń, Pasłęk, Morąg, Olsztyn) and 528 (Morąg, Miłakowo, Orneta) pass through the town. There are two railway stations in Morąg, and the Polish State Railways (PKP) provide connections with major Polish cities, such as Gdańsk, Gdynia, Szczecin, Białystok, Elbląg and Olsztyn. In the past, there was a railway connection with Ostróda through Miłomłyn (opened in 1909, passenger trains cancelled in 1992, freight trains cancelled in 1994, rail line demolished in 2006) and to Orneta through Miłakowo (opened in 1894, demolished in 1945, cancelling any train traffic).

== Sports ==
The local football club is Huragan Morąg. It competes in the lower leagues.

== Famous residents ==
- Christoph von Dohna (1583–1637), German politician
- Abraham Calovius (1612–1686), Lutheran theologian
- Johann Gottfried von Herder (1744–1803), German author, Lutheran theologian, and eminent enlightenment philosopher
- Bruno Doehring (1889-1961), German protestant theologian and pastor
- Gustav Hermann Schmischke (1883-unknown), Gauleiter
- Elisabeth von Thadden (1890–1944), German educator
- Alfred Jaedtke (1913–1992), Wehrmacht officer
- Gerhard Bondzin (born 1930), German painter - Gallery
- Bernd Heine (born 1939), German linguist
- Zbigniew Nienacki (1929–1994), Polish writer

== Religion ==
Pastoral activity in the town is the Roman Catholic Church and the Pentecostal Church - Protestant community on the nature of the Gospel, as well as the Greek Orthodox Church.
