= Dury, Warmian-Masurian Voivodeship =

Dury
- Village
- Location within Poland
- Coordinates: 53°53′53″N 19°57′30″E
- Country: Poland
- Voivodeship: Warmian-Masurian
- County: Ostróda
- Gmina: Morąg
- Population (2006): 40

Dury (Polish pronunciation: [ˈdurɨ]; German: Döhringshof) is a village in the administrative district of Gmina Morąg, within Ostróda County, Warmian-Masurian Voivodeship, in northern Poland. At the 2006 census, it had a population of 40.
