= Dobrocinek, Warmian-Masurian Voivodeship =

Dobrocinek
- Village
- Location within Poland
- Coordinates: 53°56′N 19°50′E
- Country: Poland
- Voivodeship: Warmian-Masurian
- County: Ostróda
- Gmina: Morąg

Dobrocinek [dɔbrɔˈt͡ɕinɛk] (German Neu Bestendorf) is a village in the administrative district of Gmina Morąg, within Ostróda County, Warmian-Masurian Voivodeship, in northern Poland.
