= Nowy Dwór, Ostróda County =

Nowy Dwór
- Village
- Location within Poland
- Coordinates: 53°56′01″N 19°53′08″E
- Country: Poland
- Voivodeship: Warmian-Masurian
- County: Ostróda
- Gmina: Morąg
- Population: 280

Nowy Dwór [ˈnɔvɨ ˈdvur] is a village in the administrative district of Gmina Morąg, within Ostróda County, Warmian-Masurian Voivodeship, in northern Poland.
