= Kudypy, Ostróda County =

Kudypy
- Village
- Location within Poland
- Coordinates: 53°53′N 19°52′E
- Country: Poland
- Voivodeship: Warmian-Masurian
- County: Ostróda
- Gmina: Morąg

Kudypy [kuˈdɨpɨ] (German Kuhdiebs) is a village in the administrative district of Gmina Morąg, within Ostróda County, Warmian-Masurian Voivodeship, in northern Poland.
