= Raj, Warmian-Masurian Voivodeship =

Raj
- Village
- Location within Poland
- Coordinates: 53°52′49″N 19°55′25″E
- Country: Poland
- Voivodeship: Warmian-Masurian
- County: Ostróda
- Gmina: Morąg

Raj (Polish pronunciation: [rai̯]; German: Paradies) is a village in the administrative district of Gmina Morąg, within Ostróda County, Warmian-Masurian Voivodeship, in northern Poland.
