= Szymanowo, Ostróda County =

Szymanowo
- Village
- Location within Poland
- Coordinates: 53°55′N 19°53′E
- Country: Poland
- Voivodeship: Warmian-Masurian
- County: Ostróda
- Gmina: Morąg

Szymanowo (Polish: [ʂɨmaˈnɔvɔ]) is a village in the administrative district of Gmina Morąg, within Ostróda County, Warmian-Masurian Voivodeship, in northern Poland.
