= Ruś, Ostróda County =

Ruś
- Village
- Location within Poland
- Coordinates: 53°50′N 19°58′E
- Country: Poland
- Voivodeship: Warmian-Masurian
- County: Ostróda
- Gmina: Morąg

Ruś [ruɕ] (German Reussen) is a village in the administrative district of Gmina Morąg, within Ostróda County, Warmian-Masurian Voivodeship, in northern Poland.
