= Lubin, Warmian-Masurian Voivodeship =

Lubin
- Village
- Location within Poland
- Coordinates: 53°52′N 19°55′E
- Country: Poland
- Voivodeship: Warmian-Masurian
- County: Ostróda
- Gmina: Morąg

Lubin (Polish: [ˈlubin]) is a village in the administrative district of Gmina Morąg, within Ostróda County, Warmian-Masurian Voivodeship, in northern Poland.
