= Dworek, Warmian-Masurian Voivodeship =

Dworek
- Settlement
- Location within Poland
- Coordinates: 54°00′23″N 19°50′59″E
- Country: Poland
- Voivodeship: Warmian-Masurian
- County: Ostróda
- Gmina: Morąg
- Time zone: UTC+01:00 (CET)
  - Summer (DST): UTC+02:00 (CEST)

Dworek [ˈdvɔrɛk] (German Inrücken) is a settlement in the administrative district of Gmina Morąg, within Ostróda County, Warmian-Masurian Voivodeship, in northern Poland.
