= Zwierzyniec, Ostróda County =

Zwierzyniec
- Settlement
- Location within Poland
- Coordinates: 53°54′52″N 19°59′36″E
- Country: Poland
- Voivodeship: Warmian-Masurian
- County: Ostróda
- Gmina: Morąg
- Time zone: UTC+01:00 (CET)
  - Summer (DST): UTC+02:00 (CEST)

Zwierzyniec (Polish: [zvjɛˈʐɨɲɛt͡s]) is a settlement in the administrative district of Gmina Morąg, within Ostróda County, Warmian-Masurian Voivodeship, in northern Poland.
