= Plebania Wólka =

- Settlement
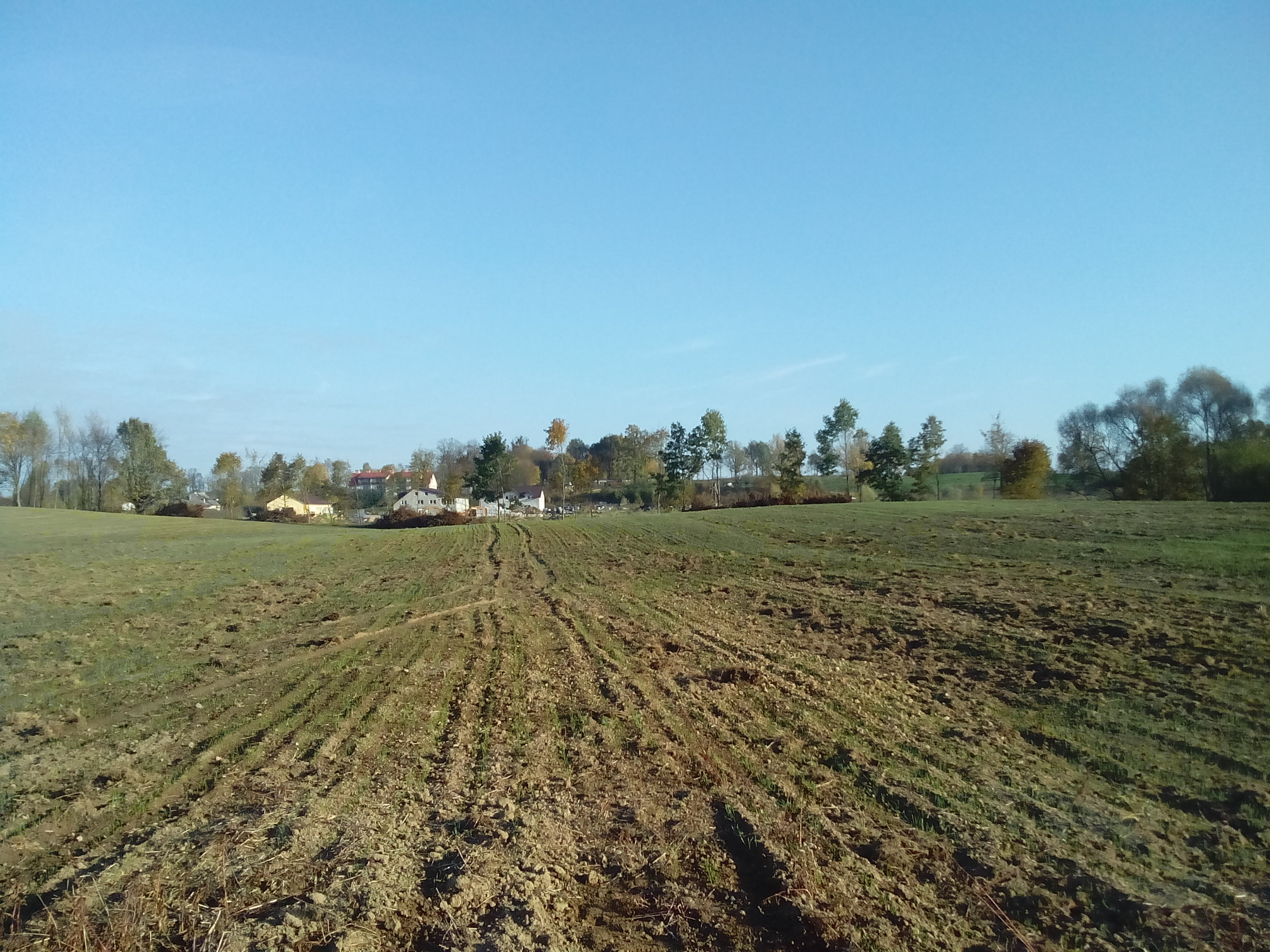
- Field in Plebania Wólka

- Location within Poland
- Coordinates: 53°55′N 19°56′E
- Country: Poland
- Voivodeship: Warmian-Masurian
- County: Ostróda
- Gmina: Morąg

Plebania Wólka [plɛˈbaɲa ˈvulka] is a settlement in the administrative district of Gmina Morąg, within Ostróda County, Warmian-Masurian Voivodeship, in northern Poland.
