= Kępa Kalnicka =

- Village
- Location within Poland
- Coordinates: 53°58′47″N 19°50′14″E
- Country: Poland
- Voivodeship: Warmian-Masurian
- County: Ostróda
- Gmina: Morąg
- Population: 80

Kępa Kalnicka [ˈkɛmpa kalˈnit͡ska] is a village in the administrative district of Gmina Morąg, within Ostróda County, Warmian-Masurian Voivodeship, in northern Poland.
