= Lusajny Małe =

- Settlement
- Location within Poland
- Coordinates: 53°53′00″N 20°03′15″E
- Country: Poland
- Voivodeship: Warmian-Masurian
- County: Ostróda
- Gmina: Morąg

Lusajny Małe [luˈsai̯nɨ ˈmawɛ] is a settlement in the administrative district of Gmina Morąg, within Ostróda County, Warmian-Masurian Voivodeship, in northern Poland.
