= Strużyna, Warmian-Masurian Voivodeship =

Strużyna
- Village
- Location within Poland
- Coordinates: 54°0′18″N 19°56′32″E
- Country: Poland
- Voivodeship: Warmian-Masurian
- County: Ostróda
- Gmina: Morąg

Strużyna [struˈʐɨna] is a village in the administrative district of Gmina Morąg, within Ostróda County, Warmian-Masurian Voivodeship, in northern Poland.
