= Borzymowo =

- Village
- Location within Poland
- Coordinates: 53°59′2″N 19°55′26″E
- Country: Poland
- Voivodeship: Warmian-Masurian
- County: Ostróda
- Gmina: Morąg
- Population: 20

Borzymowo [bɔʐɨˈmɔvɔ] is a village in the administrative district of Gmina Morąg, within Ostróda County, Warmian-Masurian Voivodeship, in northern Poland.
