= Gubity =

- Village
- Location within Poland
- Coordinates: 53°51′N 20°3′E
- Country: Poland
- Voivodeship: Warmian-Masurian
- County: Ostróda
- Gmina: Morąg

Gubity [ɡuˈbitɨ] (German Gubitten) is a village in the administrative district of Gmina Morąg, within Ostróda County, Warmian-Masurian Voivodeship, in northern Poland.
