= Anin, Warmian-Masurian Voivodeship =

Anin
- Settlement
- Location within Poland
- Coordinates: 53°57′13″N 19°50′39″E
- Country: Poland
- Voivodeship: Warmian-Masurian
- County: Ostróda
- Gmina: Morąg

Anin [ˈanin] is a settlement in the administrative district of Gmina Morąg, within Ostróda County, Warmian-Masurian Voivodeship, in northern Poland.
