= Jurecki Młyn =

- Settlement
- Location within Poland
- Coordinates: 53°56′27″N 19°56′05″E
- Country: Poland
- Voivodeship: Warmian-Masurian
- County: Ostróda
- Gmina: Morąg

Jurecki Młyn [juˈrɛt͡ski ˈmwɨn] is a settlement inside of the administrative district of Gmina Morąg, within Ostróda County, Warmian-Masurian Voivodeship, in northern Poland.
