= Niebrzydowo Małe =

- Settlement
- Location within Poland
- Coordinates: 53°58′21″N 19°58′31″E
- Country: Poland
- Voivodeship: Warmian-Masurian
- County: Ostróda
- Gmina: Morąg

Niebrzydowo Małe [ɲɛbʐɨˈdɔvɔ ˈmawɛ] is a settlement in the administrative district of Gmina Morąg, within Ostróda County, Warmian-Masurian Voivodeship, in northern Poland.
