= Obuchowo =

- Settlement
- Location within Poland
- Coordinates: 53°55′27″N 19°52′54″E
- Country: Poland
- Voivodeship: Warmian-Masurian
- County: Ostróda
- Gmina: Morąg
- Time zone: UTC+01:00 (CET)
  - Summer (DST): UTC+02:00 (CEST)

Obuchowo [ɔbuˈxɔvɔ] (German Obuchshöfchen) is a settlement in the administrative district of Gmina Morąg, within Ostróda County, Warmian-Masurian Voivodeship, in northern Poland.
