= Kretowiny =

- Village
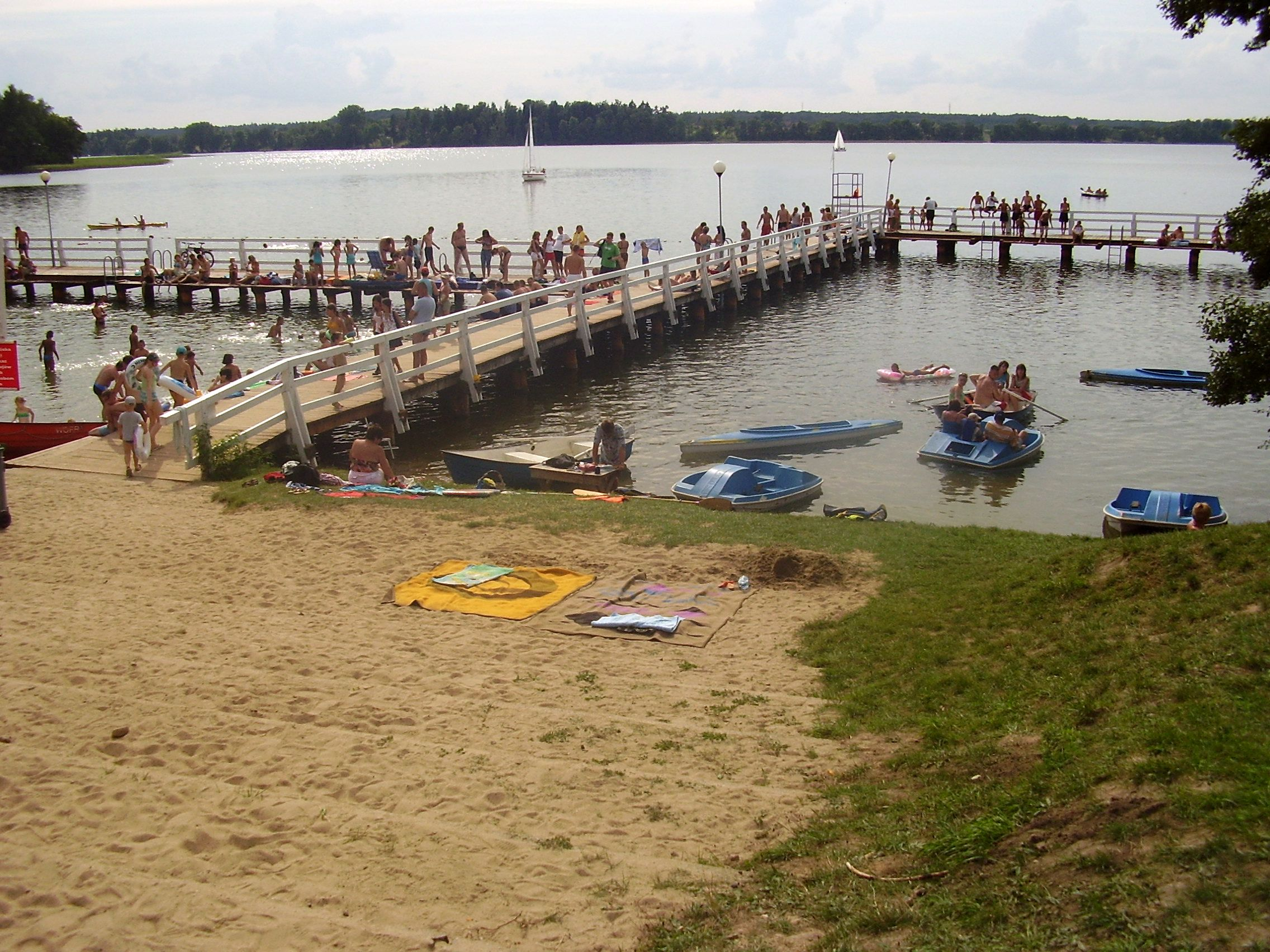

- Location within Poland
- Coordinates: 53°53′7″N 20°1′20″E
- Country: Poland
- Voivodeship: Warmian-Masurian
- County: Ostróda
- Gmina: Morąg
- Population: 140
- Website: http://www.kretowiny.strefa.pl/

Kretowiny (Polish pronunciation: [krɛtɔˈvinɨ]; German: Kranthau) is a village in the administrative district of Gmina Morąg, within Ostróda County, Warmian-Masurian Voivodeship, in northern Poland.

Kretowiny includes the largest of four campsites around Lake Narie, a popular tourist attraction. There is also a pier extending into the lake.

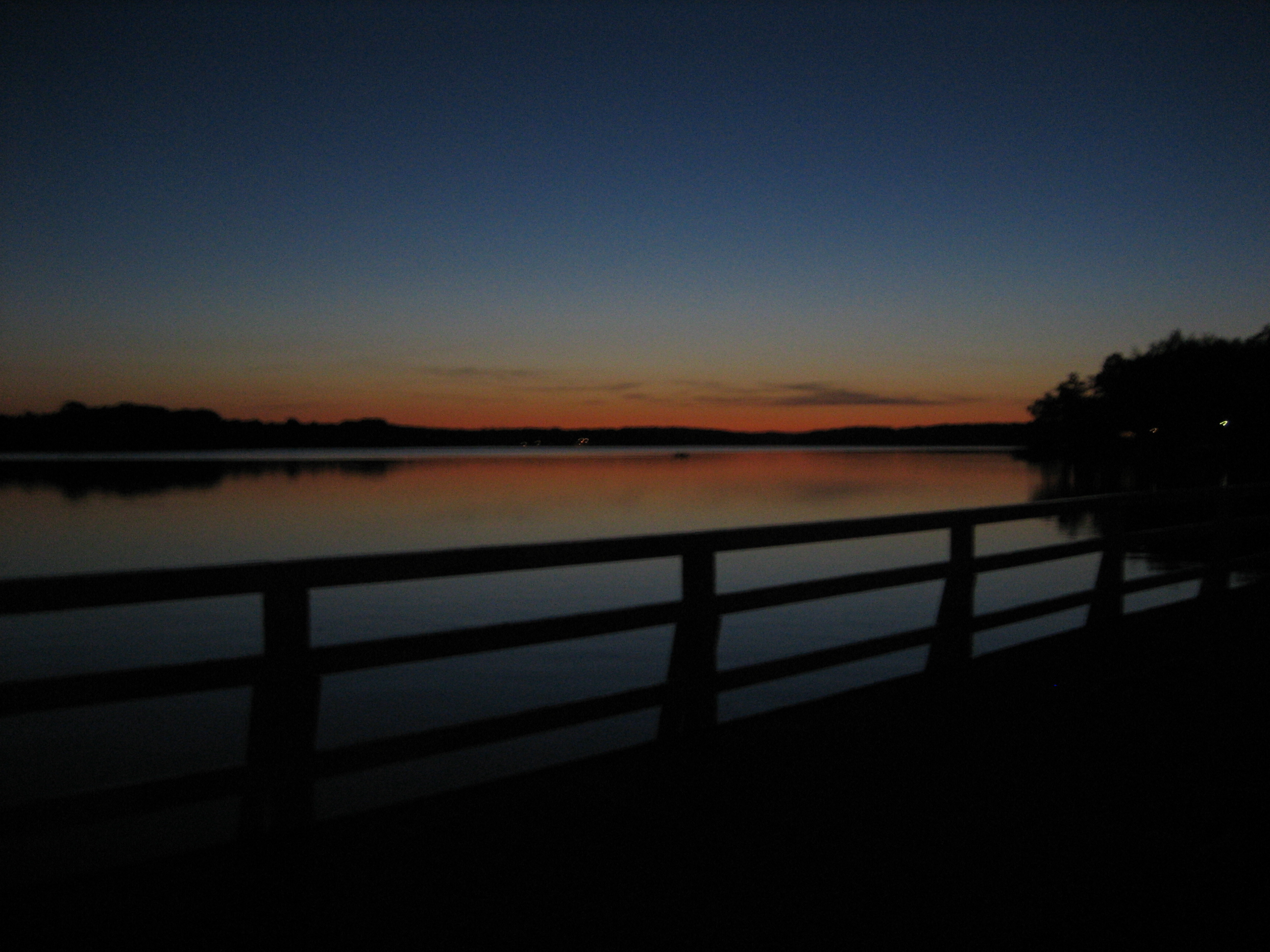
Kretowiny at dusk
