= Niebrzydowo Wielkie =

- Village
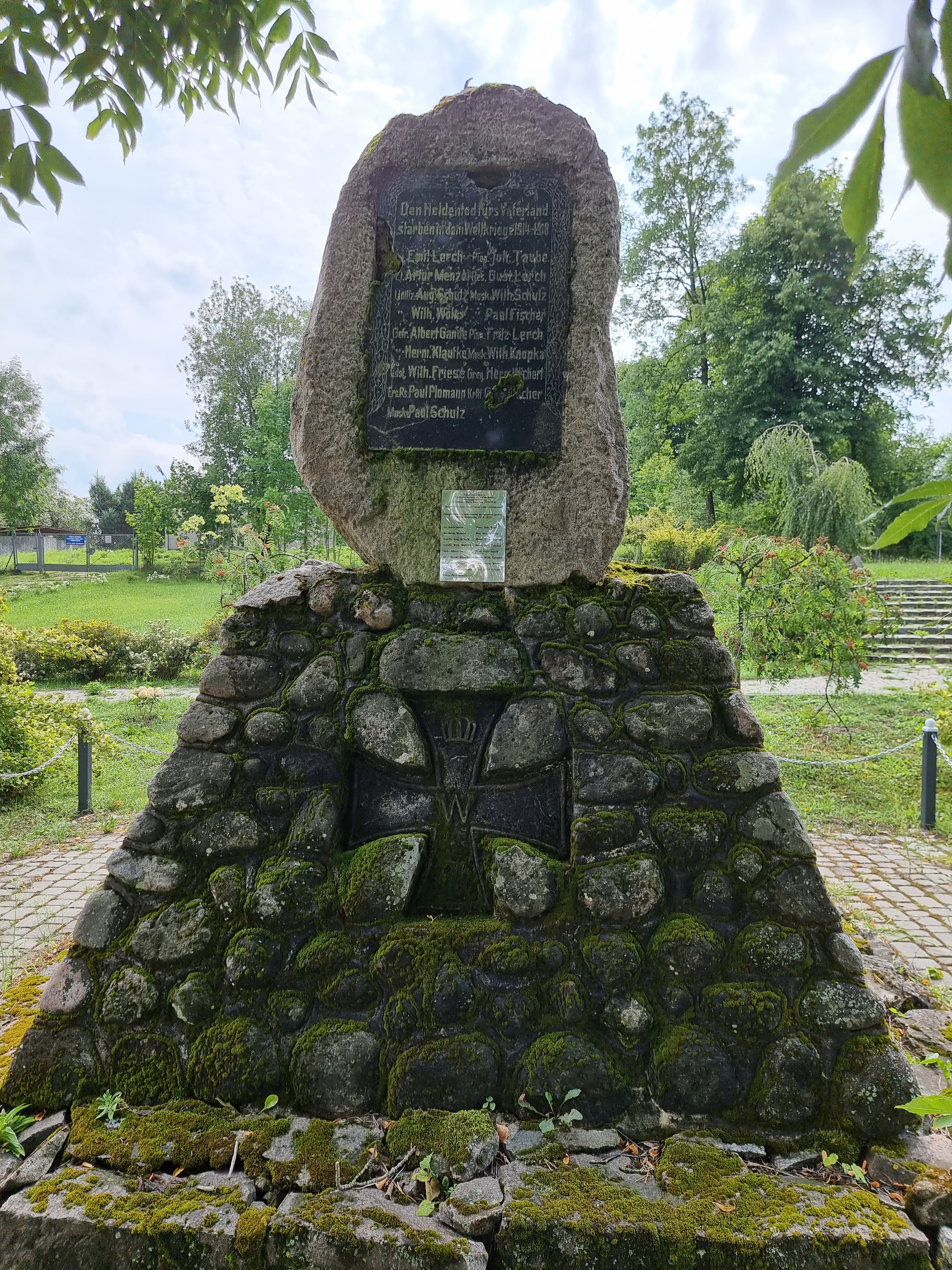
- A monument to the villagers who died during World War I

- Location within Poland
- Coordinates: 53°58′N 19°59′E
- Country: Poland
- Voivodeship: Warmian-Masurian
- County: Ostróda
- Gmina: Morąg

Niebrzydowo Wielkie [ɲɛbʐɨˈdɔvɔ ˈvjɛlkʲɛ] is a village in the administrative district of Gmina Morąg, within Ostróda County, Warmian-Masurian Voivodeship, in northern Poland.
