= Piłąg =

- Settlement
- Location within Poland
- Coordinates: 53°52′58″N 19°59′12″E
- Country: Poland
- Voivodeship: Warmian-Masurian
- County: Ostróda
- Gmina: Morąg

Piłąg (Polish pronunciation: [ˈpiwɔnk]; German: Pfeilings) is a settlement in the administrative district of Gmina Morąg, within Ostróda County, Warmian-Masurian Voivodeship, in northern Poland.

The settlement was mentioned in documents from 1402 and 1408 as a Prussian village under the original name Fewlingk, later recorded as a forester's lodge. In 1782, there were four houses, while in 1858 there were 30 inhabitants in two households.
