= Arie Maliniak =

Israeli basketball player and coach

Arie Maliniak אריה מליניאק
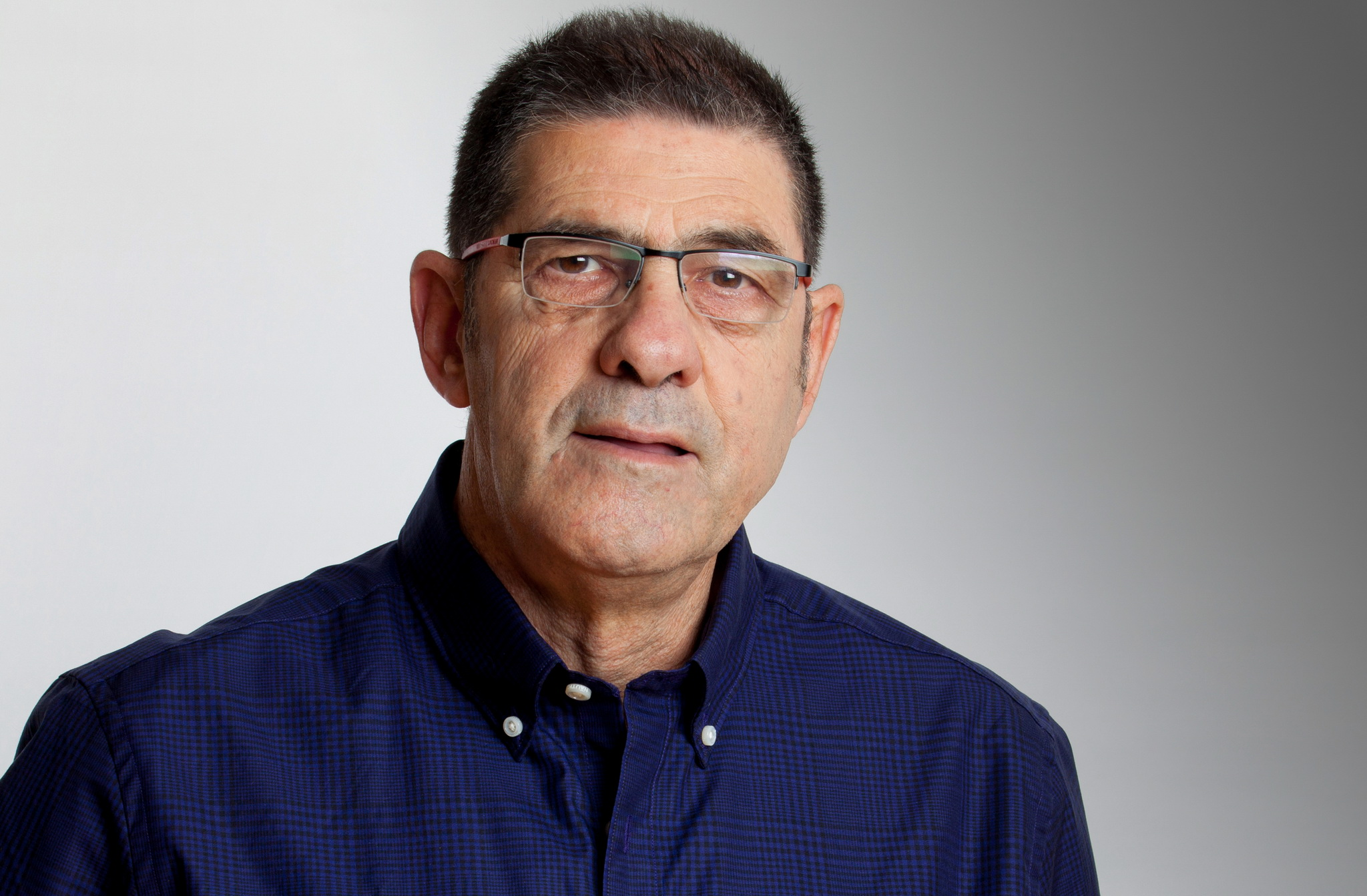

Biographical details
- Born: October 25, 1949 (age 77); Ramat Gan, Israel

Playing career
- 1967-1968: Hapoel Ramat Gan
- 1968-1971: Hapoel Tel Aviv
- 1971-1975: Hapoel Ramat Gan

Coaching career (HC unless noted)
- 1976-1978: Hapoel Ramat Gan

Hapoel Holon

Hapoel Afula
- 1977-1984: Israel U-21
- 1984: Israel
- 1984-1987: Hapoel Galil Elyon
- 1989-1990: A.S. Ramat Hasharon

Arie Maliniak (Hebrew: אריה מליניאק) is a former Israeli basketball player and coach who now works as a journalist, radio broadcaster, television presenter and as a life coach.

== Honors ==
=== As a Player ===
- National Championships (1): 1968–69
- State Cup (1): 1968–69
