= Wenecja, Warmian-Masurian Voivodeship =

Wenecja
- Village
- Location within Poland
- Coordinates: 53°51′33″N 19°50′47″E
- Country: Poland
- Voivodeship: Warmian-Masurian
- County: Ostróda
- Gmina: Morąg
- Population: 280

Wenecja (pronounced [vɛˈnɛt͡sja]; Polish for "Venice") is a village in the administrative district of Gmina Morąg, within Ostróda County, Warmian-Masurian Voivodeship, in northern Poland.
