= Gmina Morąg =

Gmina Morąg Morąg Commune
- Gmina
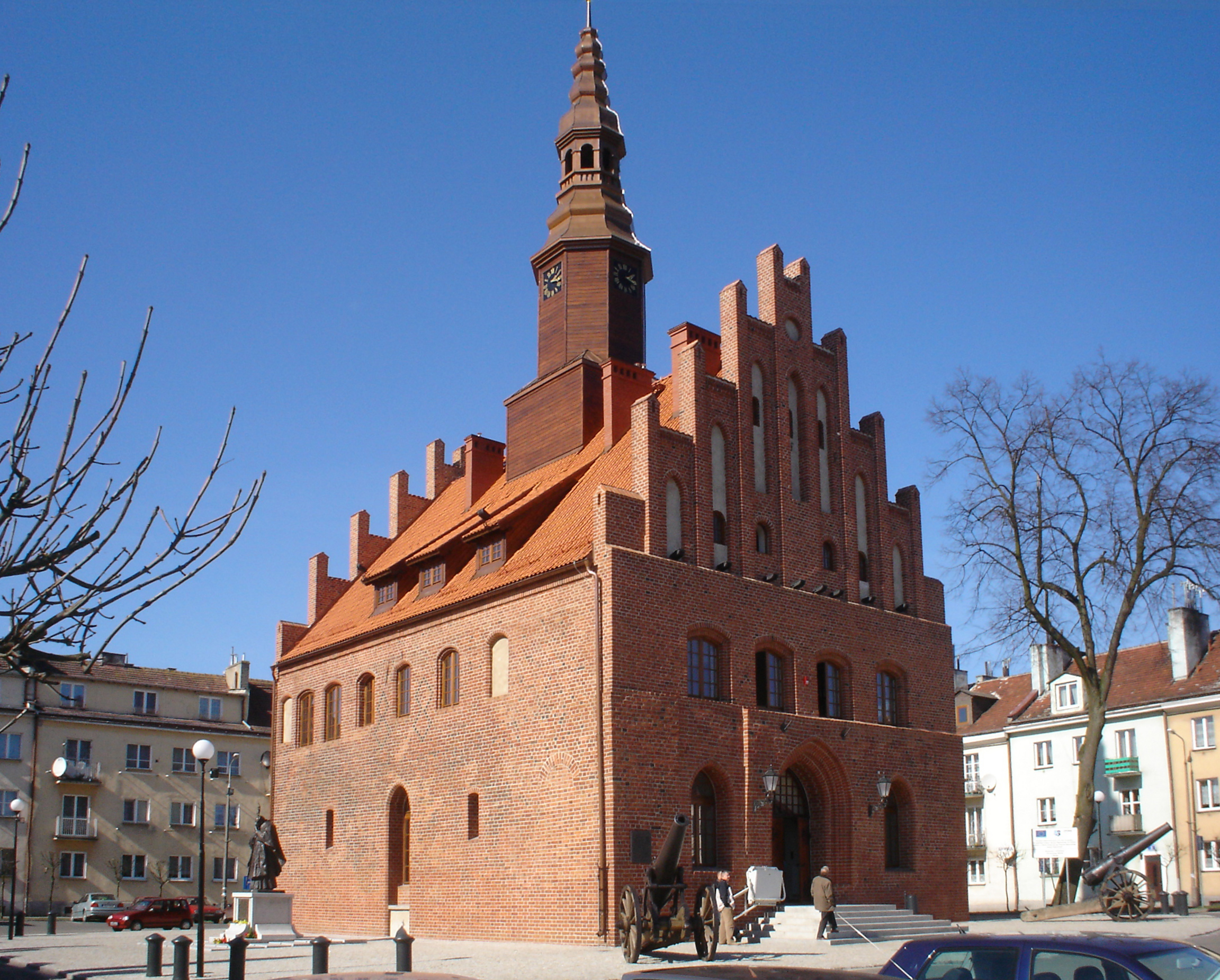

- Flag Coat of arms
- Interactive map of Gmina Morąg
- Coordinates (Morąg): 53°55′N 19°56′E
- Country: Poland
- Voivodeship: Warmian-Masurian
- County: Ostróda
- Seat: Morąg

Area
  - Total: 310.55 km^{2} (119.90 sq mi)

Population (2006)
  - Total: 24,886
  - Density: 80.135/km^{2} (207.55/sq mi)
  - Urban: 14,497
  - Rural: 10,389
- Website: https://www.morag.pl/

Gmina Morąg is an urban-rural gmina (administrative district) in Ostróda County, Warmian-Masurian Voivodeship, in northern Poland. Its seat is the town of Morąg, which lies approximately 25 kilometres (16 mi) north of Ostróda and 41 km (25 mi) west of the regional capital Olsztyn.

The gmina covers an area of 310.55 square kilometres (119.9 sq mi), and as of 2006 its total population is 24,886 (out of which the population of Morąg amounts to 14,497, and the population of the rural part of the gmina is 10,389).

== Villages ==
Apart from the town of Morąg, Gmina Morąg contains the villages and settlements of:

- Anin
- Antoniewo
- Bartężek
- Białka
- Bogaczewo
- Borzymowo
- Bożęcin
- Bramka
- Chojnik
- Dobrocinek
- Dury
- Dworek
- Gubity
- Gulbity
- Jędrychówko
- Jurecki Młyn
- Jurki
- Kadzianka
- Kamionka
- Kępa Kalnicka
- Kretowiny
- Królewo
- Kruszewnia
- Kudypy
- Łączno
- Lubin
- Lusajny Małe
- Maliniak
- Markowo
- Morzewko
- Niebrzydowo Małe
- Niebrzydowo Wielkie
- Nowy Dwór
- Obuchowo
- Piłąg
- Plebania Wólka
- Prętki
- Prośno
- Raj
- Rogowo
- Rolnowo
- Ruś
- Silin
- Słonecznik
- Stabuniki
- Strużyna
- Szczuplinki
- Szymanowo
- Tątławki
- Wenecja
- Wilnowo
- Wola Kudypska
- Worytki
- Woryty Morąskie
- Żabi Róg
- Zawroty
- Zbożne
- Złotna
- Zwierzyniec

== Neighbouring gminas ==
Gmina Morąg is bordered by the gminas of Godkowo, Łukta, Małdyty, Miłakowo, Miłomłyn, Pasłęk and Świątki.
