= Lake Narie =

Lake in Poland

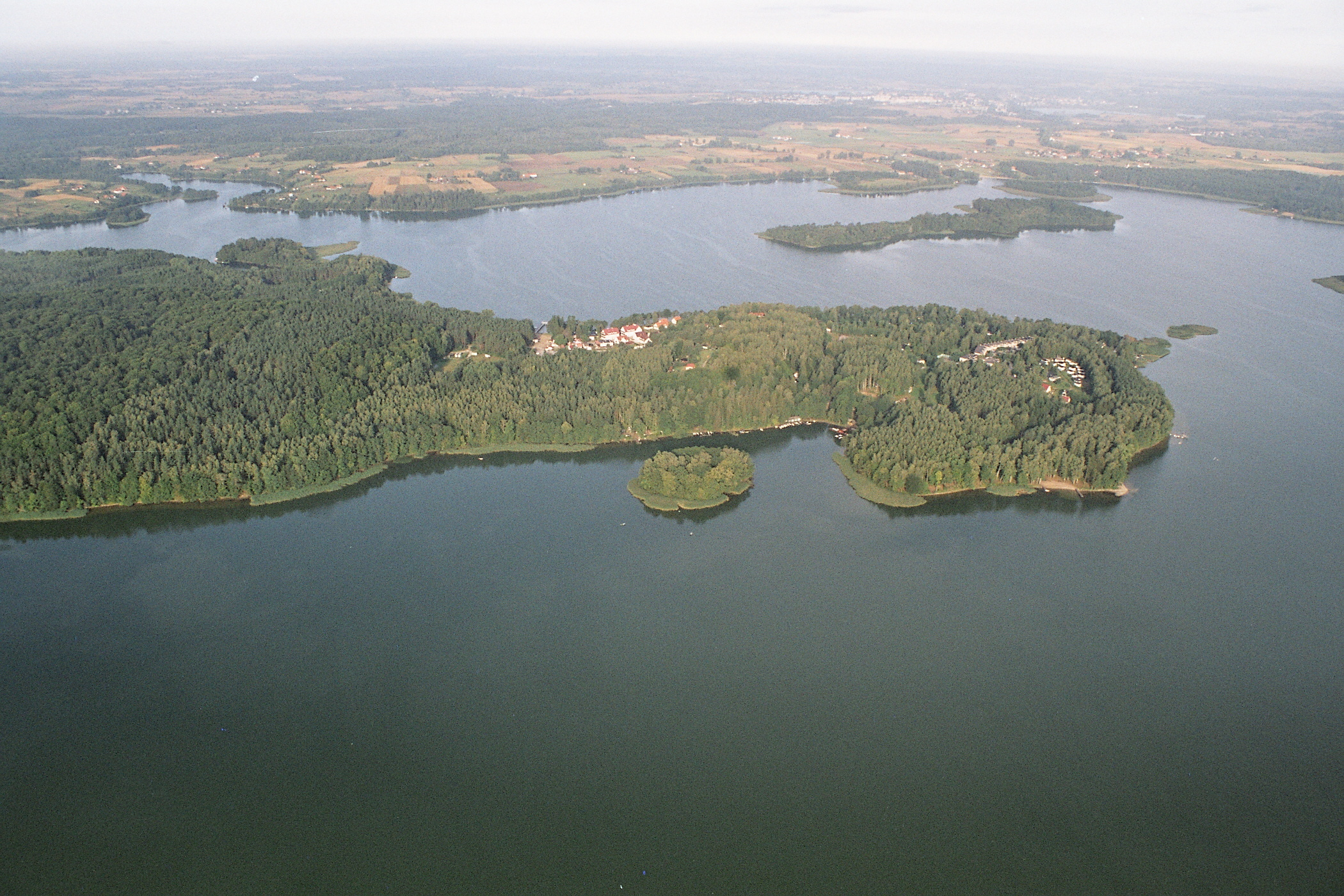

- Location within Warmian-Masurian Voivodeship Location within Poland
- Location: Iława Lake District
- Coordinates: 53°53′31″N 20°01′27″E
- Type: glacial
- Basin countries: Poland
- Surface area: 10 km^{2} (3.9 sq mi)
- Average depth: 9.8 m (32 ft)
- Max. depth: 45 m (148 ft)
- Islands: 24 (22 in Narie proper)

Lake Narie is a ribbon lake located in Poland, Warmian-Masurian Voivodeship, Ostróda County, in the Morąg Commune, in the Olsztynek Plain and partly in the Dzierzgońsko-Morąg Lakeland.
