= Kreis Mohrungen =

District of Prussia

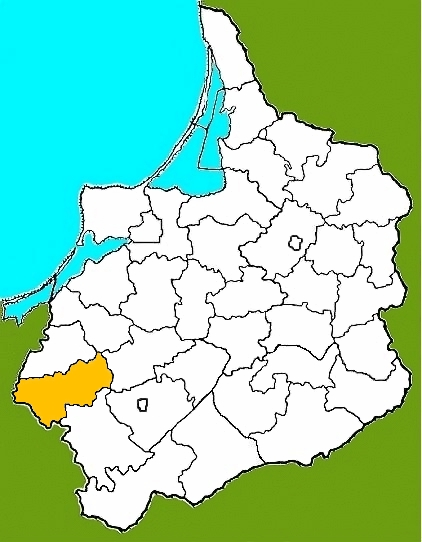
Location in East Prussia

The Mohrungen district was a district in the southwestern part of the Prussian province of East Prussia. It existed from 1818 to 1945 and belonged to Regierungsbezirk Königsberg. The seat of the district administration was the town of Mohrungen. Prior to this, from 1752 to 1818 there was a Mohrungen district in East Prussia, which however, encompassed a much larger area.

== Geography ==
The district of Mohrungen in its borders from 1818 was the westernmost district in East Prussia. It was in the Oberland, a hilly, wooded landscape with elevations of up to 100 meters. Large parts of the district belonged to the Eylauer Seenplatte, and the Geserichsee, the longest lake in East Prussia with a length of 27 km lay in the district area. The Geserichsee was also the starting point of the Oberland Canal, which, leading to Elbing, crossed the district from south to north. Another important body of water was the Passarge, which formed the eastern border of the district.

In terms of the number of lakes, the district of Mohrungen with 88 was the district with the largest number of lakes in the province of East Prussia. The total water surface of the district was 8652.87 hectares. The largest lakes were the Geserichsee (2384.27 hectares in the district), the Nariensee (1096.71 hectares), the Flachsee (635.81 hectares), the Röthloffsee (617.73 hectares), the Ewingsee (525.32 hectares), the Bärtingsee (363.11 hectares), the Große Gehlsee (260.42 hectares in the district) and the Große Rotzungsee (235.47 hectares). Eight other lakes had a water surface of over 100 hectares.

From time immemorial, the important trade route from Elbing to Warsaw led through the area. It was expanded into a permanent road in the middle of the 19th century. Railways reached the district in 1882 with the section of the Prussian State Railway Marienburg-Allenstein having a train station in Mohrungen. The town of Saalfeld was connected to the rail network in 1893 with the Elbing-Osterode line. From Mohrungen, a line to Wormditt was built in 1896, which was extended south to Osterode in 1902.

There were 83,832 hectares of agricultural land and 24,552 hectares of forest land in the district. A total of 64% of those employed in the district worked on these lands. In 1939, 4,667 farms were registered. Industry was relatively underdeveloped. The only large factory was the spinning mill in Workallen, which was commissioned in 1937 and employed around 800 people. A sawmill in Mohrungen processed the wood cut in the nearby forests.

== History ==
=== Early history ===
The district of Mohrungen was located in the historical regions of Pomesania and Pogesania described by the chronicler Peter of Dusburg in 1324. This area between the Vistula and the Pasłęka was inhabited as early as the Neolithic (4000 BC) and has remained continuously inhabited until modern times. During the era of the Roman Empire (1st to 3rd centuries AD), Germanic tribes already lived here. When they migrated to the west from the 6th century onwards, the Old Prussians coming from the Baltic region settled in the area.

=== Teutonic Order ===
In the 13th century, the Teutonic Order launched the Prussian Crusade in the region. As part of the State of the Teutonic Order, commanderies were set up for the administration of the country. The area of Mohrungen was split between the Elbing Commandery and the Christburg Commandery. Immigrants from Central Germany (Thuringia and Harz) were settled in these commanderies. The first town charter was granted at the beginning of the 14th century. As a result of the Reformation, the Teutonic Order was secularized in 1525 and the State of the Teutonic Order was converted into the Duchy of Prussia. The commanderies were replaced by districts (Kreise), the area of the future district of Mohrungen became part of the Oberland district.

=== Kingdom of Prussia ===
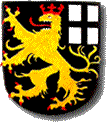
Coat of arms

After the founding of the Kingdom of Prussia, the administrative system was reorganized and the individual parts of the country were subdivided into new districts. For East Prussia, this regulation came into force in 1752, and with it, the district of Mohrungen was created, with its capital at Mohrungen. The following towns belonged to the district in this period:

- Hohenstein
- Liebemühl
- Liebstadt
- Mohrungen
- Mühlhausen
- Osterode
- Preußisch Holland
- Saalfeld

A comprehensive district reform was carried out in all of East Prussia, as the districts established in 1752 had proven to be inexpedient and too large. The Mohrungen district was reduced in size on February 1, 1818 and now only comprised the central part of the old district. The rest of the old district became part of the new Osterode and Preußisch Holland districts. The district of Mohrungen was part of the administrative region of Königsberg, and now only the three towns of Liebstadt, Mohrungen and Saalfeld were part of the district area. Carl von Sydow, who had held the office of district administrator in the old Mohrungen district since 1813, remained in this position with his official seat in the district town of Mohrungen.

=== Germany ===
The newly delimited district of Mohrungen included the parishes of Alt Christburg, Altstadt, Arnsdorf, Eckersdorf, Herzogswalde, Jäskendorf, Kahlau, Liebstadt, Liebwalde, Miswalde, Mohrungen, Reichau, Saalfeld, Samrodt, Schnellwalde, Silberbach, Simnau, Sonnenborn und Venedien, Weinsdorf and Wilmsdorf. Since 1871, the district belonged to the German Empire. After the Province of Prussia was divided into the provinces of East Prussia and West Prussia, the district of Mohrungen became part of East Prussia in 1878.

In January 1945, the Red Army had reached the borders of the district in the course of their winter offensive. The district administration issued an evacuation order on January 22, according to which the population of the western part of the district should flee towards Elbing and that of the eastern part should flee via Heilsberg. However, given the poor road conditions and the rapid advance of enemy troops, the escape ended in chaos. At the end of January 1945, the entire district was taken by the Red Army. In the summer of 1945, the district of Mohrungen was placed under Polish administration by the Soviets in accordance with the Potsdam Agreement, together with the southern half of East Prussia. In the period that followed, the German population was largely expelled from the district by the local Polish administrative authorities.

Today the territory of the district is located in the northwestern part of the Polish Warmian-Masurian Voivodeship.

== Demographics ==
The district had a mostly German population with a small Polish minority. The vast majority of the population was Protestant.

Ethnolinguistic structure of the district
	1828		1837		1861	
Germans	35,635	97.1%	38,451	98.2%	51,381	99.2%
Poles	1,057	2.9%	696	1.8%	434	0.8%
Total	36,692		39,147		51,815	

== Municipalities ==
Kreis Mohrungen had 35 rural municipalities and 3 towns:

Alt Bestendorf; Alt Christburg; Alt Christburg-Forst; Arnsdorf; Auer; Bauditten; Bolitten; Eckersdorf; Georgenthal; Gerswalde	Gottswalde; Groß Simnau; Hanswalde; Herzogswalde; Himmelforth; Jäskendorf; Kahlau; Karnitten; Koschainen; Kuppen	Liebwalde; Maldeuten; Miswalde; Mohrungen, city; Münsterberg; Nickelshagen; Pörschken; Ponarien; Preußisch Mark; Prökelwitz	Reichau; Reichertswalde; Sassen; Sonnenborn; Stollen; Terpen; Venedien; Waltersdorf; Weinsdorf

== Politics ==
In the German Empire, Kreis Mohrungen together with Kreis Preußisch Holland formed the Reichstag constituency of Königsberg 7. The constituency was won by conservative candidates in all Reichstag elections between 1871 and 1912.
