= Rudnya =

Rudnya may refer to:

in Belarus

- Rudnya, Brest District, a village in Brest Region, Belarus
- Rudnya, a former village in Belarus, now part of Aktsyabarski

in Russia

- Rudnya, Russia, name of several inhabited localities in Russia

== See also ==
- Rudnia (disambiguation)
