= Barten =

Barten may refer to:

- Barten (surname), a surname
- Bartians, an Old Prussian tribe
- Barten, the German name for Barciany, a village in Kętrzyn County, Warmian-Masurian Voivodeship, Poland
- Barten, the German name for Barty, Warmian-Masurian Voivodeship, a village in Iława County, Poland
