= Roje =

may refer to:

- Roje, Poland, a village in the administrative district of Gmina Miłakowo in the Warmian-Masurian Voivodeship in northern Poland
- Roje, Slovenia, a settlement in the Šentjernej municipality in southeastern Slovenia
