= Albertz =

Albertz is a surname. Notable people with the surname include:

- Heinrich Albertz (1915–1993), German Protestant theologian, priest and politician
- Jörg Albertz (born 1971), German footballer
- Luise Albertz (1901–1979), German politician
- Martin Albertz (1882–1956), Germann clergyman, resistance fighter, and teacher
- Sandra Albertz (born 1975), German footballer
