= Wieprz (disambiguation) =

The Wieprz is a river in central-eastern Poland.

Wieprz may also refer to the following villages:

- Wieprz, Lesser Poland Voivodeship (south Poland)
- Wieprz, Silesian Voivodeship (south Poland)
- Wieprz, Warmian-Masurian Voivodeship (north Poland)
