= Bartzen =

Bartzen is a surname. Notable people with the surname include:

- Bernard Bartzen (1927–2019), American tennis player
- Peter Bartzen (1857–1934), American businessman and politician

== See also ==
- Barten (surname)
