= Rudnia =

Rudnia may refer to the following places:

== Poland ==
- Rudnia, Gmina Czarna Białostocka in Podlaskie Voivodeship, north-east Poland
- Rudnia, Gmina Michałowo in Podlaskie Voivodeship, north-east Poland
- Rudnia, Warmian-Masurian Voivodeship, north Poland
- Rudnia River, a tributary in Poland of the Narew

== Lithuania ==
- Rudnia (Kaniava), a village in Kaniava eldership, Varėna district municipality, Alytus County

== Ukraine ==
- Rudnia, Kyiv Oblast
- Verkhnia Rudnia, Zhytomyr Oblast

== See also ==
- Rudnya (disambiguation)
