= Rycerzewo, Warmian-Masurian Voivodeship =

Rycerzewo
- Settlement
- Location within Poland
- Coordinates: 54°2′2″N 20°5′13″E
- Country: Poland
- Voivodeship: Warmian-Masurian
- County: Ostróda
- Gmina: Miłakowo
- Population: 30

Rycerzewo [rɨt͡sɛˈʐɛvɔ] is a settlement in the administrative district of Gmina Miłakowo, within Ostróda County, Warmian-Masurian Voivodeship, in northern Poland.
