= Gilginie =

- Village
- Location within Poland
- Coordinates: 54°1′32″N 19°59′20″E
- Country: Poland
- Voivodeship: Warmian-Masurian
- County: Ostróda
- Gmina: Miłakowo

Gilginie [ɡilˈɡiɲɛ] (German Gillgehnen) is a village in the administrative district of Gmina Miłakowo, within Ostróda County, Warmian-Masurian Voivodeship, in northern Poland.
