= Girgajny =

- Village
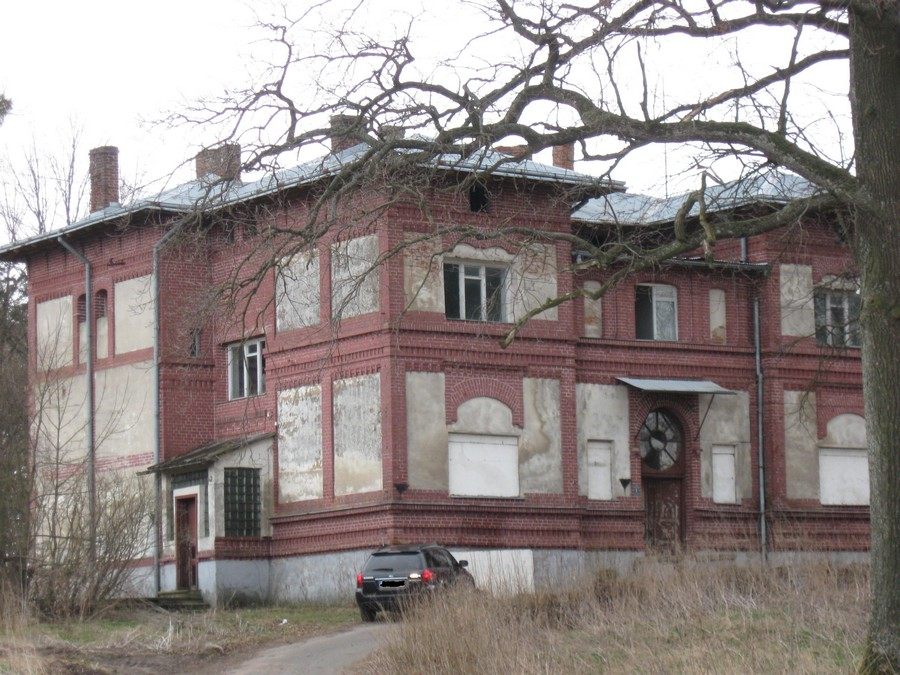

- Location within Poland
- Coordinates: 53°51′28″N 19°39′51″E
- Country: Poland
- Voivodeship: Warmian-Masurian
- County: Iława
- Gmina: Zalewo
- Time zone: UTC+1 (CET)
  - Summer (DST): UTC+2 (CEST)

Girgajny [ɡirˈɡai̯nɨ] (German Gergehnen) is a village in the administrative district of Gmina Zalewo, within Iława County, Warmian-Masurian Voivodeship, in northern Poland.
