= Polkajny =

- Village
- Location within Poland
- Coordinates: 54°2′N 20°7′E
- Country: Poland
- Voivodeship: Warmian-Masurian
- County: Ostróda
- Gmina: Miłakowo

Polkajny [pɔlˈkai̯nɨ] (German Polkehnen) is a village in the administrative district of Gmina Miłakowo, within Ostróda County, Warmian-Masurian Voivodeship, in northern Poland.
