= Witoszewo =

- Village
- Location within Poland
- Coordinates: 53°49′51″N 19°30′50″E
- Country: Poland
- Voivodeship: Warmian-Masurian
- County: Iława
- Gmina: Zalewo
- Population: 240
- Time zone: UTC+1 (CET)
  - Summer (DST): UTC+2 (CEST)

Witoszewo [vitɔˈʂɛvɔ] is a village in the administrative district of Gmina Zalewo, within Iława County, Warmian-Masurian Voivodeship, in northern Poland.
