= Elisabeth Lemke =

German historian (1849–1925)

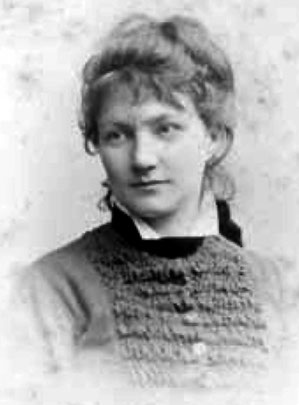
- Born: 5 July 1849; Rombitten (now Poland)
- Died: 11 August 1925 (aged 76); Sopot, Poland

Elisabeth Lemke (5 July 1849 – 11 August 1925) was a German historian, researcher of folklore, botany and prehistory of Upper Prussia, poet, and writer.

== Life and work ==
Lemke was born on 5 June 1849 in Rombitten (now Rąbity in northern Poland), the eldest of 10 children of the local landowner, Richard Lemke, and was raised by a governess.

She was interested early on in the customs and traditions of her East Prussian homeland. She acquired knowledge on her own initiative that went beyond her schooling. In 1886 at age 37, she moved to Berlin. There she attracted attention by giving a series of more than 200 public lectures on ethnological and prehistoric topics and did so in Germany, New York, and Scranton Pennsylvania. Her discussions included topics that were extremely diverse: prehistoric children's toys, magic dolls, board and stone games, spinning and weaving equipment, plant mythology, soldiers' songs, and Sicilian baked goods. Most of her lectures were later printed in the journal of the Society for Local History of the Province of Brandenburg.

Lemke's financial independence allowed her to travel extensively to Russia, America and North Africa. Artifacts that she brought back with her found their way into the museums of Berlin, Danzig, Königsberg and Nuremberg. Her main published work Volkstümliches in Ostpreußen (three parts 1884-1899) contains her extensive collection of material on the ethnography of her homeland.

Lemke was a participating member of several scientific associations, including a full member of the Berlin Anthropological Society, corresponding member of the Prussia in Königsberg, the Lithuanian Literary Society, committee member of the Society for Folklore. She worked with the Germanisches National-Museum in Nuremberg and the Märkisches Provincial Museum in Berlin, among others. In 1899, the Märkisches Provincial Museum awarded her its gold medal, the first woman to receive that honor.

Lemke also made many connections to museums and associations around the world, including the National Museum in Washington, D.C., as a result of her participation in prehistoric excavations.

With the end of the First World War, Elisabeth Lemke settled in Oliva near Danzig. She remained unmarried and died on 11 August 1925 in a retirement home in Sopot (then in the Free City of Danzig).

== Selected works ==
- Volkstümliches in Ostpreußen. 3 vols.. Mohrungen/Allenstein 1884–99; unveränderter Nachdruck: Olms, Hildesheim/New York 1978, ISBN 3-487-06585-1 ( at Google Books).
