= Trokajny, Gmina Miłakowo =

Trokajny
- Village
- Location within Poland
- Coordinates: 53°57′N 20°7′E
- Country: Poland
- Voivodeship: Warmian-Masurian
- County: Ostróda
- Gmina: Miłakowo

Trokajny [trɔˈkai̯nɨ] is a village in the administrative district of Gmina Miłakowo, within Ostróda County, Warmian-Masurian Voivodeship, in northern Poland.
