= Gubławki =

- Village
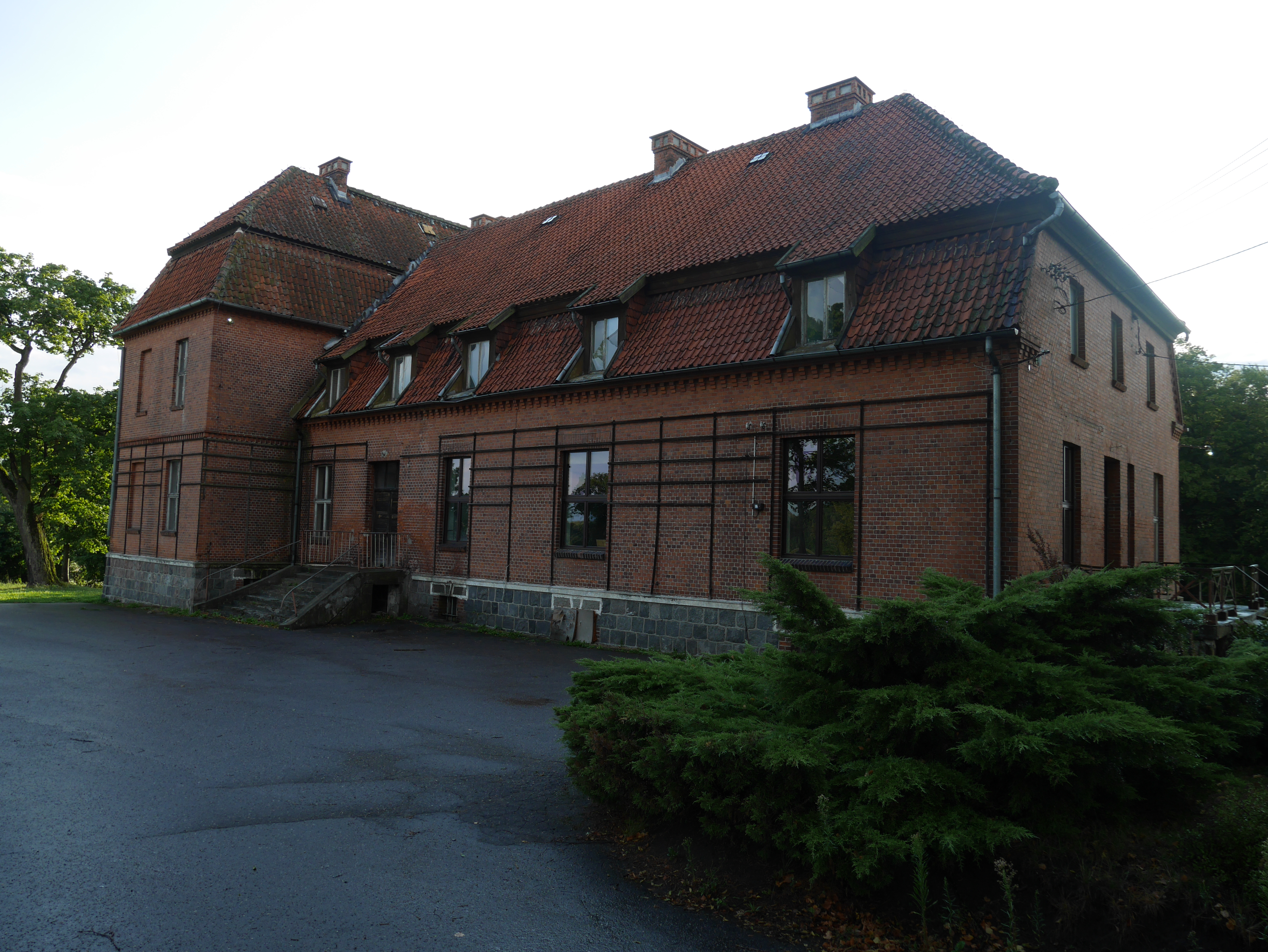
- Old manor house in Gubławki

- Location within Poland
- Coordinates: 53°45′N 19°39′E
- Country: Poland
- Voivodeship: Warmian-Masurian
- County: Iława
- Gmina: Zalewo
- Time zone: UTC+1 (CET)
  - Summer (DST): UTC+2 (CEST)
- Vehicle registration: NIL

Gubławki [ɡuˈbwafki] is a village in the administrative district of Gmina Zalewo, within Iława County, Warmian-Masurian Voivodeship, in northern Poland. It is situated on the north-eastern shore of Lake Gardno.

The Radomski Polish noble family lived in the village.
