= Bednarzówka, Warmian-Masurian Voivodeship =

Bednarzówka
- Village
- Location within Poland
- Coordinates: 53°49′23″N 19°32′13″E
- Country: Poland
- Voivodeship: Warmian-Masurian
- County: Iława
- Gmina: Zalewo
- Population: 20
- Time zone: UTC+1 (CET)
  - Summer (DST): UTC+2 (CEST)

Bednarzówka [bɛdnaˈʐufka] is a village in the administrative district of Gmina Zalewo, within Iława County, Warmian-Masurian Voivodeship, in northern Poland.
