= Skitławki =

- Settlement
- Location within Poland
- Coordinates: 53°47′43″N 19°38′33″E
- Country: Poland
- Voivodeship: Warmian-Masurian
- County: Iława
- Gmina: Zalewo
- Time zone: UTC+1 (CET)
  - Summer (DST): UTC+2 (CEST)

Skitławki [skiˈtwafki] (German Skittlauken) is a settlement in the administrative district of Gmina Zalewo, within Iława County, Warmian-Masurian Voivodeship, in northern Poland.
