= Różnowo, Ostróda County =

Różnowo
- Village
- Location within Poland
- Coordinates: 54°1′48″N 20°2′20″E
- Country: Poland
- Voivodeship: Warmian-Masurian
- County: Ostróda
- Gmina: Miłakowo
- Population: 60

Różnowo [ruʐˈnɔvɔ] is a village in the administrative district of Gmina Miłakowo, within Ostróda County, Warmian-Masurian Voivodeship, in northern Poland.
