= Kłodzin, Warmian-Masurian Voivodeship =

Kłodzin
- Village
- Location within Poland
- Coordinates: 53°57′51″N 20°11′34″E
- Country: Poland
- Voivodeship: Warmian-Masurian
- County: Ostróda
- Gmina: Miłakowo
- Population: 30

Kłodzin [ˈkwɔd͡ʑin] is a village in the administrative district of Gmina Miłakowo, within Ostróda County, Warmian-Masurian Voivodeship, in northern Poland.
