= Miejski Dwór =

- Village
- Location within Poland
- Coordinates: 54°0′N 20°2′E
- Country: Poland
- Voivodeship: Warmian-Masurian
- County: Ostróda
- Gmina: Miłakowo

Miejski Dwór [ˈmjɛi̯ski ˈdvur] is a village in the administrative district of Gmina Miłakowo, within Ostróda County, Warmian-Masurian Voivodeship, in northern Poland.
