= Rąbity =

- Village
- Location within Poland
- Coordinates: 53°49′N 19°38′E
- Country: Poland
- Voivodeship: Warmian-Masurian
- County: Iława
- Gmina: Zalewo
- Time zone: UTC+1 (CET)
  - Summer (DST): UTC+2 (CEST)

Rąbity [rɔmˈbitɨ] (German Rombitten) is a village in the administrative district of Gmina Zalewo, within Iława County, Warmian-Masurian Voivodeship, in northern Poland.

== Famous people ==
- Elisabeth Lemke (1849–1925), was a German historian, researcher of folklore, botany and prehistory of Upper Prussia, poet and writer.
