= Gudniki, Ostróda County =

Gudniki
- Village
- Location within Poland
- Coordinates: 54°1′N 20°0′E
- Country: Poland
- Voivodeship: Warmian-Masurian
- County: Ostróda
- Gmina: Miłakowo

Gudniki [ɡudˈniki] (German Gudnick) is a village in the administrative district of Gmina Miłakowo, within Ostróda County, Warmian-Masurian Voivodeship, in northern Poland.
