= Zatyki, Iława County =

Zatyki
- Village
- Location within Poland
- Coordinates: 53°49′34″N 19°39′17″E
- Country: Poland
- Voivodeship: Warmian-Masurian
- County: Iława
- Gmina: Zalewo
- Time zone: UTC+1 (CET)
  - Summer (DST): UTC+2 (CEST)

Zatyki [zaˈtɨki] (German Kattern) is a village in the administrative district of Gmina Zalewo, within Iława County, Warmian-Masurian Voivodeship, in northern Poland.
