= Karpowo =

- Village
- Location within Poland
- Coordinates: 53°45′N 19°38′E
- Country: Poland
- Voivodeship: Warmian-Masurian
- County: Iława
- Gmina: Zalewo
- Time zone: UTC+1 (CET)
  - Summer (DST): UTC+2 (CEST)

Karpowo [karˈpɔvɔ] (German Kerpen) is a village in the administrative district of Gmina Zalewo, within Iława County, Warmian-Masurian Voivodeship, in northern Poland.
