= Śliwa, Warmian-Masurian Voivodeship =

Śliwa
- Village
- Location within Poland
- Coordinates: 53°47′26″N 19°40′9″E
- Country: Poland
- Voivodeship: Warmian-Masurian
- County: Iława
- Gmina: Zalewo
- Time zone: UTC+1 (CET)
  - Summer (DST): UTC+2 (CEST)
- Vehicle registration: NIL

Śliwa [ˈɕliva] is a village in the administrative district of Gmina Zalewo, within Iława County, Warmian-Masurian Voivodeship, in northern Poland.

The Brzozowski Polish noble family lived in the village.
