= Dietrich Stobbe =

German politician (1938–2011)

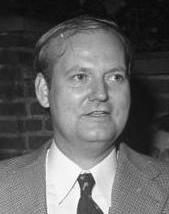

Governing Mayor of Berlin (West Berlin)
- In office 2 May 1977 – 23 January 1981
- President: Karl Carstens
- Chancellor: Helmut Schmidt
- Preceded by: Klaus Schütz
- Succeeded by: Hans-Jochen Vogel

President of the Bundesrat
- In office 1 November 1978 – 31 October 1979
- Preceded by: Gerhard Stoltenberg
- Succeeded by: Hans-Ulrich Klose

Personal details
- Born: 25 March 1938 Wieprz, East Prussia, Germany
- Died: 19 February 2011 (aged 72) Berlin, Germany
- Party: SPD

Dietrich Stobbe (25 March 1938 – 19 February 2011) was a German politician who served as the Mayor of West Berlin from 1977 to 1981, as a member of the Social Democratic Party (SPD). Stobbe also served as President of the Bundesrat from 1 November 1978 to 31 October 1979.

== Early life, education, and career ==
Dietrich Stobbe was born on 25 March 1938 in Wieprz in what was then East Prussia. After graduating from high school in Stade, Lower Saxony, he came to Berlin and studied political science at the Free University. In 1960, while still a student, he joined the Social Democratic Party (SPD) and a short time later was elected district manager in the Charlottenburg district. From 1963 to 1966 he was a press officer in the Senate Department for Youth and Sport, after which he worked for around a year as an assistant to the board of a Berlin brewery company.

== Political career ==
=== Early political career ===
In 1967 Dietrich Stobbe became a member of the Abgeordnetenhaus and only three months later took over the position of the parliamentary manager of the SPD. In 1970, he became vice chairman of the parliamentary group and in 1973, under Klaus Schütz, he became a senator for federal affairs. After Schütz's resignation in 1977, Stobbe was elected as mayor, as he had not worn himself out in internal party power struggles and was familiar with the federal political scene. On 2 May 1977 he was elected to the office of governing mayor by the Abgeordnetenhaus, and from 1979 he became the state chairman of the SPD.

=== Mayor of Berlin ===
As mayor, Stobbe was faced with the challenge of restoring the ailing trust in the Senate's ability to act. Stobbe also reformed the administration of the city as well as the transportation of the city. In December 1978, after eleven years of construction, the new building of the State Library, designed by Hans Scharoun, was opened, followed in April 1979 by the inauguration of the International Congress Center (ICC).

In the 1979 state elections to the Abgeordnetenhaus, the SPD-FDP (Free Democratic Party) coalition narrowly maintained its majority; however, the Christian Democratic Union (CDU) remained the largest party. This resulted in Stobbe being re-elected as governing mayor, but his power was weakened. In December 1980, the Berliner Bank of the construction company Dietrich Garski, which had secured a loan of 115 million marks, terminated the loan due to suspected fraud (which was later confirmed), and the company then had to file for bankruptcy. The state government came under increasing pressure, and as a result, two senators resigned, two other members of the government offered their resignation. A reshuffle of the Senate then failed, ending the SPD-FDP Senate. On 15 January 1981, Dietrich Stobbe resigned from the entire Senate.

=== Post-mayoralty ===
After leaving the mayoralty, Stobbe went to New York and took over the management of the Friedrich-Ebert-Stiftung's office there. After his return in 1983, he moved to the Bundestag as a member of the SPD, where he was a member of the Foreign Affairs Committee until 1990. He then decided to work outside of politics, joining the service of an American investment advisory firm as a manager.

== Death ==
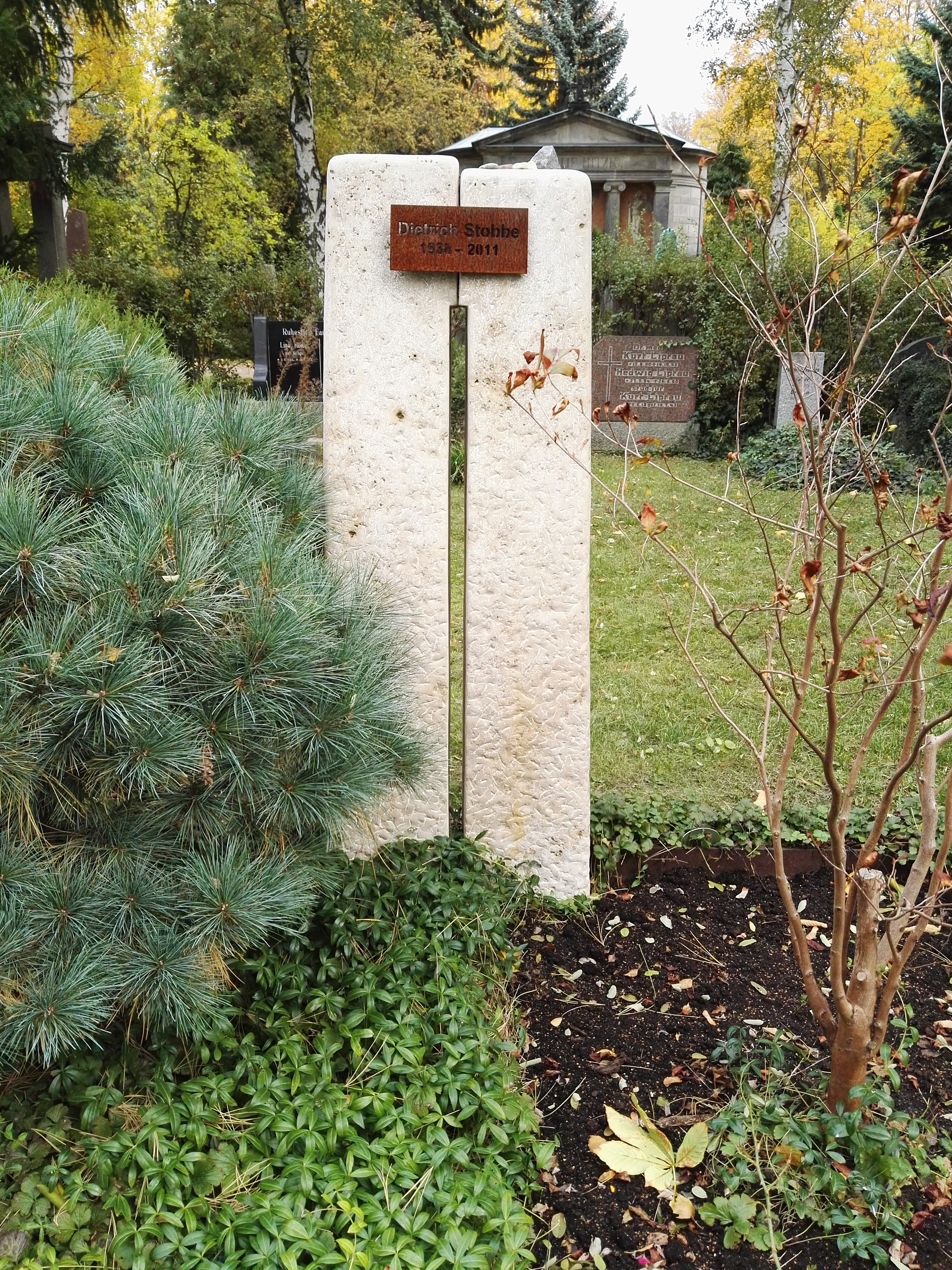
Stobbe's grave

Dietrich Stobbe died on 19 February 2011 in Berlin after a long and serious illness.

Political offices
Preceded by Klaus Schütz	Mayor of West Berlin; 1977–1981	Succeeded by Hans-Jochen Vogel
