= Warkały, Ostróda County =

Warkały
- Village
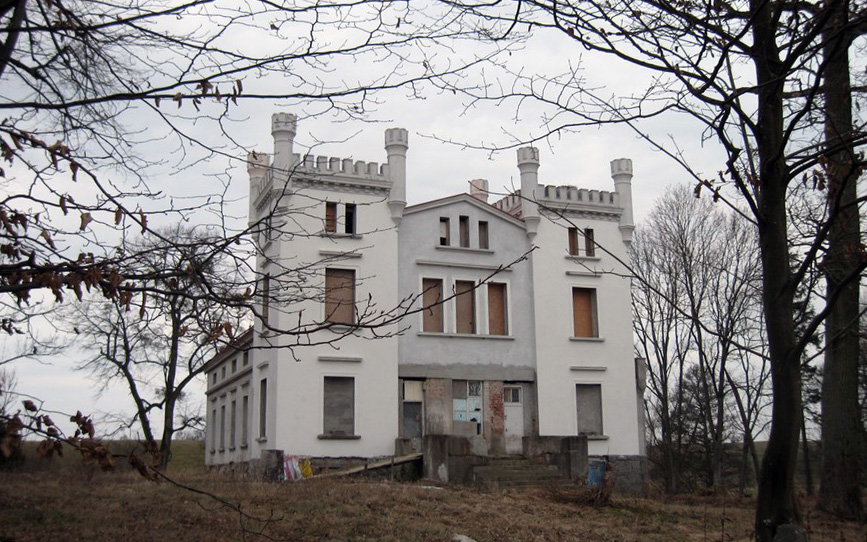

- Location within Poland
- Coordinates: 53°59′N 20°1′E
- Country: Poland
- Voivodeship: Warmian-Masurian
- County: Ostróda
- Gmina: Miłakowo

Warkały [varˈkawɨ] is a village in the administrative district of Gmina Miłakowo, within Ostróda County, Warmian-Masurian Voivodeship, in northern Poland.
