= Warny =

- Village
- Location within Poland
- Coordinates: 53°59′26″N 20°3′13″E
- Country: Poland
- Voivodeship: Warmian-Masurian
- County: Ostróda
- Gmina: Miłakowo
- Population: 80

Warny [ˈvarnɨ] is a village in the administrative district of Gmina Miłakowo, within Ostróda County, Warmian-Masurian Voivodeship, in northern Poland.
