= Międzychód, Warmian-Masurian Voivodeship =

Międzychód
- Village
- Location within Poland
- Coordinates: 53°48′18″N 19°39′16″E
- Country: Poland
- Voivodeship: Warmian-Masurian
- County: Iława
- Gmina: Zalewo
- Time zone: UTC+1 (CET)
  - Summer (DST): UTC+2 (CEST)

Międzychód [mjɛnˈd͡zɨxut] (German Mitteldorf) is a village in the administrative district of Gmina Zalewo, within Iława County, Warmian-Masurian Voivodeship, in northern Poland.
