= Pomielin =

- Village
- Location within Poland
- Coordinates: 53°46′3″N 19°36′46″E
- Country: Poland
- Voivodeship: Warmian-Masurian
- County: Iława
- Gmina: Zalewo
- Time zone: UTC+1 (CET)
  - Summer (DST): UTC+2 (CEST)

Pomielin [pɔˈmjɛlin] (German Pomehlen) is a village in the administrative district of Gmina Zalewo, within Iława County, Warmian-Masurian Voivodeship, in northern Poland.
