= Count Karl Bonaventura Finck von Finckenstein =

Prussian politician

Count Karl Bonaventura Finck von Finckenstein (born Jäskendorf 13 May 1794 - Jäskendorf 19 January 1865) was a Prussian Chamberlain, Member of the Prussian House of Lords ("Preußisches Herrenhaus") and Master of Schönberg
