= Janiki Wielkie =

- Village
- Location within Poland
- Coordinates: 53°49′30″N 19°42′30″E
- Country: Poland
- Voivodeship: Warmian-Masurian
- County: Iława
- Gmina: Zalewo
- Time zone: UTC+1 (CET)
  - Summer (DST): UTC+2 (CEST)

Janiki Wielkie [jaˈniki ˈvjɛlkʲɛ] (German Groß Hanswalde) is a village in the administrative district of Gmina Zalewo, within Iława County, Warmian-Masurian Voivodeship, in northern Poland.
