= Pojezierce =

- Village
- Location within Poland
- Coordinates: 53°55′13″N 20°1′53″E
- Country: Poland
- Voivodeship: Warmian-Masurian
- County: Ostróda
- Gmina: Miłakowo

Pojezierce [pɔjɛˈʑɛrt͡sɛ] is a village in the administrative district of Gmina Miłakowo, within Ostróda County, Warmian-Masurian Voivodeship, in northern Poland.
