= Klaus Schütz =

German politician (1926–2012)

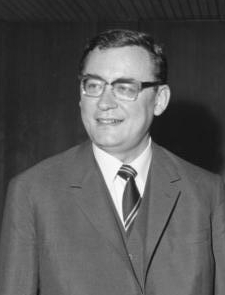
- Schütz in 1969

Governing Mayor of Berlin (West Berlin)
- In office 19 October 1967 – 2 May 1977
- President: Heinrich Lübke; Gustav Heinemann; Walter Scheel
- Chancellor: Kurt Georg Kiesinger; Willy Brandt; Helmut Schmidt
- Preceded by: Heinrich Albertz
- Succeeded by: Dietrich Stobbe

President of the Bundesrat
- In office 1 November 1967 – 31 October 1968
- Preceded by: Helmut Lemke
- Succeeded by: Herbert Weichmann

Personal details
- Born: Klaus Schütz; 17 September 1926 Heidelberg, Baden-Württemberg, Germany
- Died: 29 November 2012 (aged 86) Wilmersdorf, Berlin, Germany
- Resting place: Waldfriedhof Zehlendorf
- Party: SPD
- Spouse: Adelheid

Klaus Schütz (17 September 1926 – 29 November 2012) was a German politician, who served as the Mayor of West Berlin from 1967 to 1977, as a member of the Social Democratic Party (SPD).

== Early life ==
=== Early life and World War II ===
Klaus Schütz was born in Heidelberg on 17 September 1926. Schütz was the son of a lawyer, and he grew up in Berlin. After graduating from high school, he was drafted into the army as an anti-aircraft helper in 1944. During the last days of the war he was seriously wounded in Italy, as a result of his right arm remained paralyzed throughout his life.

=== University and left wing politics ===
After the end of the war, Schütz began studying history and German at the Humboldt University in Berlin. He joined the working group of social democratic students and was a member of the student council from 1947. Soon afterwards he was a delegate of the Wilmersdorfer Young Socialists in the state committee of the Social Democratic Party (SPD). When in June 1948 three fellow students were evicted by the administration of the Humboldt University, located in the Soviet occupation zone, Schütz resigned with other members of the student council and moved to the Free University in the American sector. In 1949 he completed an additional political science course at Harvard University in the United States.

== Political career ==
=== Early political career ===
He returned to Berlin, and Schütz took on an assistant position at the Institute for Political Science at the Free University. In 1951, the Berlin Young Socialists elected him as their chairman. Since then, he was mainly supported by Willy Brandt, whose successor he was in the office of the Wilmersdorfer SPD. From 1955 to 1957, he was a member of the Berlin House of Representatives and, from 1958 to 1961, of the German Bundestag. In the 1961 federal election campaign, he headed Willy Brandt's election office. When Willy Brandt became Foreign Minister, Schütz followed his mentor, who made him State Secretary in the Foreign Office. In 1967, Schütz was elected mayor by the Abgeordnetenhaus, after the resignation of Heinrich Albertz, after a student, named Benno Ohnesorg, was shot by a police officer during a demonstration.

=== Mayor of Berlin ===
As mayor, Schütz's term in office saw a phase of global political calming down of the Cold War, in a period known as Détente. This was reflected in the Four-Power Agreement signed in Berlin, which reconfirmed the existence of the rights and responsibilities of the Four Powers for the future of Berlin and Germany. The Agreement improved travel and communications between the two parts of the city and brought numerous improvements for the residents of the Western Sectors. The agreement was followed six months later by the Basic Treaty, which saw both West and East Germany recognize each other as sovereign states for the first time and the abandonment of West Germany's Hallstein Doctrine in favor of Ostpolitik.

Schütz's SPD suffered losses in the 1971 West Berlin state election, but again defended the absolute majority with 50.4 percent. The SPD Party then terminated the coalition with the Free Democratic Party (FDP), governing alone from then on. However, internal party fights continued and in 1975, the SPD finally lost its absolute majority in the Abgeordnetenhaus, with the Christian Democratic Union (CDU) becoming the largest party. Schütz then formed another coalition, again with the FDP. But scandals and affairs increasingly weakened his government. When Interior Senator Neubauer had to admit irregularities in connection with income from a supervisory board position, Schütz gave up. On 2 May 1977, he resigned from the office of mayor, and a little later he also resigned from the state chairmanship of the SPD.

=== Post-mayoralty ===
After resigning from the mayoralty, he worked as German Ambassador to Israel from 1977 until 1981. Later, he took over the management of the Deutsche Welle broadcasting company, and became director of the State Broadcasting Corporation in North Rhine-Westphalia. After his retirement, Klaus Schütz returned to Berlin in 1992 to devote himself to journalistic tasks and the activity as president of the Berlin regional association of the German Red Cross.

== Death ==
Schütz died on 29 November 2012, aged 86, from pneumonia in Berlin.

== Personal life ==
Schütz married Adelheid (1924–2006), daughter of a parson, in 1952.

== Awards ==
- 1972: Great Cross of Merit of the Federal Republic of Germany
- 1975: Large Cross of Merit with star and shoulder ribbon
- 2006: Order of Merit of the State of Berlin

Political offices
Preceded by Heinrich Albertz	Mayor of West Berlin; 1967–1977	Succeeded by Dietrich Stobbe
