= Henrykowo, Ostróda County =

Henrykowo
- Village
- Location within Poland
- Coordinates: 53°59′55″N 20°2′19″E
- Country: Poland
- Voivodeship: Warmian-Masurian
- County: Ostróda
- Gmina: Miłakowo

Henrykowo [xɛnrɨˈkɔvɔ] is a village in the administrative district of Gmina Miłakowo, within Ostróda County, Warmian-Masurian Voivodeship, in northern Poland.
