= Wojciechy, Ostróda County =

Wojciechy
- Village
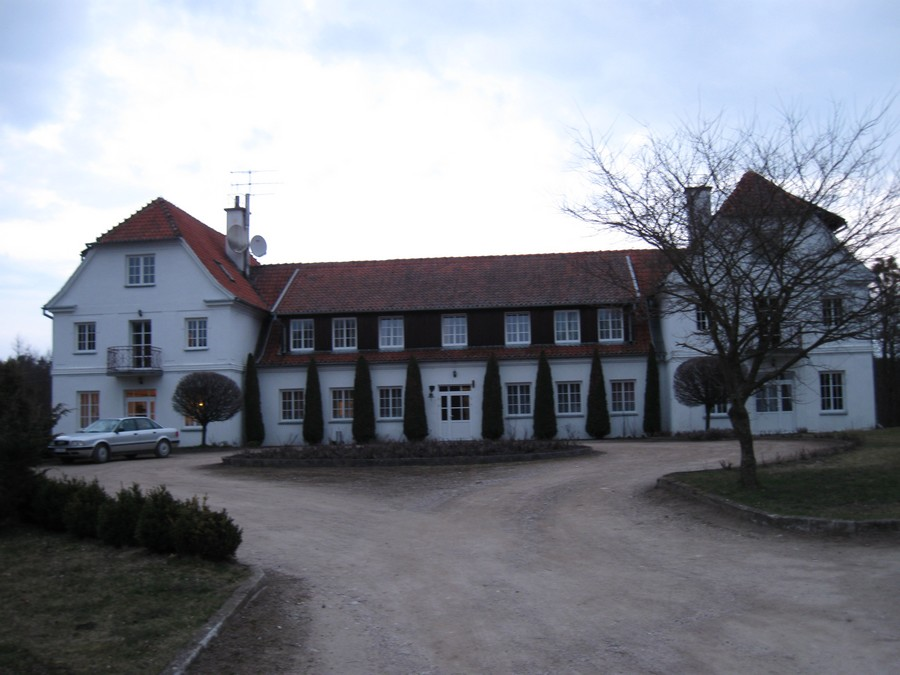

- Location within Poland
- Coordinates: 53°58′37″N 20°10′39″E
- Country: Poland
- Voivodeship: Warmian-Masurian
- County: Ostróda
- Gmina: Miłakowo

Wojciechy (Polish: [vɔjˈt͡ɕɛxɨ]) is a village in the administrative district of Gmina Miłakowo, within Ostróda County, Warmian-Masurian Voivodeship, in northern Poland.
