= Sadławki, Iława County =

Sadławki
- Village
- Location within Poland
- Coordinates: 53°53′21″N 19°35′03″E
- Country: Poland
- Voivodeship: Warmian-Masurian
- County: Iława
- Gmina: Zalewo
- Time zone: UTC+1 (CET)
  - Summer (DST): UTC+2 (CEST)

Sadławki [saˈdwafki] is a village in Gmina Zalewo, Iława County, Warmian-Masurian Voivodeship, Poland.
