= Pityny =

- Village
- Location within Poland
- Coordinates: 54°0′37″N 20°6′22″E
- Country: Poland
- Voivodeship: Warmian-Masurian
- County: Ostróda
- Gmina: Miłakowo

Pityny [piˈtɨnɨ] is a village in the administrative district of Gmina Miłakowo, within Ostróda County, Warmian-Masurian Voivodeship, in northern Poland.
