= Głodówko, Warmian-Masurian Voivodeship =

Głodówko
- Village
- Location within Poland
- Coordinates: 54°02′22″N 20°05′19″E
- Country: Poland
- Voivodeship: Warmian-Masurian
- County: Ostróda
- Gmina: Miłakowo

Głodówko [ɡwɔˈdufkɔ] (German Karneyen) is a village in the administrative district of Gmina Miłakowo, within Ostróda County, Warmian-Masurian Voivodeship, in northern Poland.
