= Piekło, Warmian-Masurian Voivodeship =

Piekło
- Settlement
- Location within Poland
- Coordinates: 53°47′20″N 19°42′45″E
- Country: Poland
- Voivodeship: Warmian-Masurian
- County: Iława
- Gmina: Zalewo
- Time zone: UTC+1 (CET)
  - Summer (DST): UTC+2 (CEST)

Piekło [ˈpjɛkwɔ] (German Kleinschnellwalde) is a settlement in the administrative district of Gmina Zalewo, within Iława County, Warmian-Masurian Voivodeship, in northern Poland.
