= Niegławki =

- Village
- Location within Poland
- Coordinates: 53°57′52″N 20°7′57″E
- Country: Poland
- Voivodeship: Warmian-Masurian
- County: Ostróda
- Gmina: Miłakowo
- Population: 30

Niegławki [ɲɛˈɡwafki] is a village in the administrative district of Gmina Miłakowo, within Ostróda County, Warmian-Masurian Voivodeship, in northern Poland.
