= Königsberg (region) =

East Prussian Regierungsbezirk Königsberg (green), as of 1905.

Regierungsbezirk Königsberg was a Regierungsbezirk, or government region, of the Prussian province of East Prussia from 1815 until 1945. The regional capital was Königsberg (since 1946, Kaliningrad).

== History ==
In 1808 during the Napoleonic Wars, East Prussia was divided into Regierungsbezirke Gumbinnen and Königsberg, comprising the western parts of the former Duchy of Prussia and the territory of the Prince-Bishopric of Warmia, annexed by Prussia in 1772. On November 1, 1905, the southern districts of the two regions were separated to create Regierungsbezirk Allenstein. According to the Prussian census of 1905, the reduced Regierungsbezirk Königsberg had a population of 893,427, of which around 96% were Germans and 4% were Lithuanians, who were mainly concentrated in the districts of Labiau and Memel.

Regierungsbezirk Königsberg was dissolved in 1945 when East Prussia was partitioned between Poland and the Soviet Union (Kaliningrad Oblast) after World War II.

== Districts in 1937 ==
As of December 31, 1937

=== Urban districts ===
1. Königsberg (Pr)

=== Rural districts ===
1. Bartenstein (Ostpr.) (Bartoszyce today)
2. Braunsberg (Ostpr.) (Brainewo today, Brunsberga between 1466-1772 and 1945–1946)
3. Fischhausen (Seat: Fischhausen) (Primorsk today)
4. Gerdauen (Zheleznodorozhny today, pronounced "Jeleznodorojni")
5. Heiligenbeil District (Mamonovo today)
6. Heilsberg (Lidzbark Warmiński between 1466-1772 and since 1945)
7. Königsberg i. Pr.
8. Labiau (Polessk today)
9. Mohrungen (Morąg today)
10. Preußisch Eylau (Bagrationovsk today, Ilawka between 1945 and 1946)
11. Preußisch Holland (Pasłęk today)
12. Rastenburg (Kętrzyn today, Rastembork between 1945 and 1950)
13. Wehlau (Znamensk today)

== Districts in 1945 ==
As of January 1, 1945

=== Urban districts ===
1. Königsberg

=== Rural districts ===
1. Bartenstein (Ostpr.)
2. Braunsberg (Ostpr.)
3. Gerdauen
4. Heiligenbeil District
5. Heilsberg
6. Labiau
7. Mohrungen
8. Preußisch Eylau
9. Preußisch Holland
10. Rastenburg
11. Samland (seat: Königsberg)
12. Wehlau
