= Hans-Joachim Kroschinski =

German flying ace (1920–1985)

- Born: 11 May 1920; Saalfeld in East Prussia, Germany (now Poland)
- Died: 7 January 1995 (aged 74); Eutin, West Germany
- Military career
- Allegiance: Nazi Germany
- Branch: Luftwaffe
- Service years: 1939–1945
- Rank: Leutnant (second lieutenant)
- Unit: JG 54
- Conflicts: World War II: Eastern Front
- Awards: Knight's Cross of the Iron Cross

Hans-Joachim Kroschinski (11 May 1920 – 7 January 1995) was a former Luftwaffe fighter ace and recipient of the Knight's Cross of the Iron Cross during World War II.

== World War II ==
Serving with 2./JG 54 Kroschinski gained his first known Soviet victory, a MiG-3 on 5 August 1942. He had a total of four by the end of 1942.

=== Ace-in-a-day? ===
On 21 December 1944 in the Courland Pocket, Kroschinski may have become an "ace-in-a-day", when he claimed five Petlyakov Pe-2 bombers near Frauenburg, now Frombork in northern Poland. The authors Obermaier and Weal also state that Kroschinski claimed five Pe-2s that day. However, the authors Prien, Stemmer, Balke and Bock state that I. Gruppe pilots claimed five Pe-2s shot down, but only two by Kroschinski, two further by Feldwebel Johann Neidlinger and one by an unknown pilot.

Kroschinski was then shot down in his Focke-Wulf Fw 190 A-9 (Werknummer 380360—factory number) in combat with Pe-2 bombers and Yakovlev Yak-9 fighters. Severely wounded, he managed to bail out at 09:05 southeast of Frauenburg. In this encounter, Kroschinski lost his eyesight and his right leg. During his convalescence on 17 April 1945, Kroschinki was awarded the Knight's Cross of the Iron Cross (Ritterkreuz des Eisernen Kreuzes) for 76 aerial victories claimed, the last recipient of JG 54.

== Later life ==
Kroschinski died on 7 January 1985 at the age of 64 in Eutin, West Germany.

== Summary of career ==
=== Aerial victory claims ===
According to US historian David T. Zabecki, Kroschinski was credited with 76 aerial victories. The authors Heaton, Lewis, Olds and Schulze also list him with 76 aerial victories. Spick states that his 76 aerial victories were claimed in 360 combat missions. Mathews and Foreman, authors of Luftwaffe Aces — Biographies and Victory Claims, researched the German Federal Archives and found documentation for 74 aerial victories, plus two further unconfirmed claims, all of which claimed on the Eastern Front.

Victory claims were logged to a map-reference (PQ = Planquadrat), for example "PQ 20732". The Luftwaffe grid map (Jägermeldenetz) covered all of Europe, western Russia and North Africa and was composed of rectangles measuring 15 minutes of latitude by 30 minutes of longitude, an area of about 360 square miles (930 km^{2}). These sectors were then subdivided into 36 smaller units to give a location area 3 km × 4 km (1.9 mi × 2.5 mi) in size.

Chronicle of aerial victories
This and the # (hash mark) indicates those aerial victories listed by Prien, Stemmer, Balke and Bock without an explicit sequence number. This and the ? (question mark) indicates information discrepancies listed by Prien, Stemmer, Rodeike, Bock, Mathews and Foreman.
Claim	Date	Time	Type	Location	Claim	Date	Time	Type	Location
– 2. Staffel of Jagdgeschwader 54 – Eastern Front — June 1942 – 3 February 1943
1	5 August 1942	15:20	MiG-3	PQ 20732; 55 km (34 mi) northeast of Malaya Vishera	5	22 January 1943	08:50	Yak-1	PQ 10241; 25 km (16 mi) east-southeast of Shlisselburg
2	11 August 1942	14:28	Il-2	PQ 28172; 25 km (16 mi) west-northwest of Demyansk	6	23 January 1943	13:37	Il-2	PQ 00413; 10 km (6.2 mi) east of Pushkin
3	27 August 1942	11:48	Yak-1	PQ 46232; 30 km (19 mi) southeast of Zubtsov	7	23 January 1943	13:39	Il-2	PQ 00411; 10 km (6.2 mi) east of Pushkin
4	11 November 1942	08:33	P-40	PQ 10211; 45 km (28 mi) west of Volkhov	8	24 January 1943	09:48	La-5	PQ 10241; 25 km (16 mi) east-southeast of Shlisselburg
– 2. Staffel of Jagdgeschwader 54 – Eastern Front — 4 February – September 1943
9	11 February 1943	09:35	Il-2	PQ 36 Ost 00484; 10 km (6.2 mi) west of Tosno	24? (Note: This claim is not listed by Mathews and Foreman.)	12 August 1943	13:39	unknown	
10	14 February 1943	13:37? (Note: According to Mathews and Foreman claimed at 13:45.)	Il-2	PQ 36 Ost 00254; 15 km (9.3 mi) west-southwest of Shlisselburg	25	20 August 1943	06:03	LaGG-3	PQ 35 Ost 51743; 20 km (12 mi) southeast of Akhtyrka
11	23 February 1943	07:00? (Note: According to Mathews and Foreman claimed at 07:05.)	Il-2	PQ 36 Ost 00254; 15 km (9.3 mi) west-southwest of Shlisselburg	26	21 August 1943	06:53	La-5	PQ 35 Ost 51394; 20 km (12 mi) west-northwest of Grayvoron
12	24 February 1943	11:31	LaGG-3	PQ 36 Ost 10151 southeast of Shlisselburg	27	22 August 1943	06:15	Il-2	PQ 35 Ost 51891; 25 km (16 mi) northwest of Kharkov
13	2 March 1943	11:18	MiG-3	PQ 36 Ost 01751; 20 km (12 mi) north of Leningrad	28	22 August 1943	06:17	LaGG-3	PQ 35 Ost 51864; 25 km (16 mi) east of Bogodukhov
14	3 May 1943	15:21? (Note: According to Mathews and Foreman claimed at 15:31.)	LaGG-3	PQ 36 Ost 00121; 15 km (9.3 mi) northwest of Pushkin	29	24 August 1943	07:36	La-5	PQ 35 Ost 41663
15	3 May 1943	15:30	LaGG-3? (Note: According to Mathews and Foreman claimed as a Lavochkin La-5.)	PQ 36 Ost 00123 vicinity of Leningrad	30	24 August 1943	07:37	La-5	PQ 35 Ost 41664
16	8 June 1943	13:38	P-40	PQ 36 Ost 00331 vicinity of Pushkin	31	24 August 1943	07:38	La-5	PQ 35 Ost 41662
17	13 July 1943	13:43	Il-2 m.H. (Note: The "m.H." refers to an Ilyushin Il-2 with rear gunner (mit Heckschütze).)	PQ 35 Ost 63222; 40 km (25 mi) east of Orel	32	25 August 1943	17:56? (Note: According to Mathews and Foreman claimed at 17:58.)	La-5	PQ 35 Ost 51553 northeast of Bogodukhov
18	16 July 1943	09:45	La-5	PQ 35 Ost 54179; 20 km (12 mi) northeast of Zhizdra	33	11 September 1943	14:29	LaGG-3	PQ 35 Ost 34242; 25 km (16 mi) northeast of Seschtschinskaja
19	16 July 1943	09:47	La-5	PQ 35 Ost 54185; 30 km (19 mi) east-northeast of Zhizdra	34	11 September 1943	14:58	Il-2	PQ 35 Ost 35873; 45 km (28 mi) west-southwest of Kirov
20	17 July 1943	06:34? (Note: According to Mathews and Foreman claimed at 06:37.)	La-5	PQ 35 Ost 54788; 25 km (16 mi) west-northwest of Bolkhov	35	12 September 1943	09:24	LaGG-3	PQ 35 Ost 44142; 25 km (16 mi) southwest of Kirov
21	17 July 1943	13:30	LaGG-3	southwest of Bolkhov	36	14 September 1943	16:10? (Note: According to Mathews and Foreman claimed at 16:11.)	Yak-9	PQ 35 Ost 26673; 25 km (16 mi) northeast of Moschna
22	19 July 1943	08:43	La-5	northwest of Kerenkowo	37	15 September 1943	13:42	Pe-2? (Note: According to Mathews and Foreman claimed as a Ilyushin Il-2.)	PQ 35 Ost 35342; 15 km (9.3 mi) northwest of Yelnya
23	12 August 1943	07:40	La-5	east of Schipeilowka					
– 11. Staffel of Jagdgeschwader 54 – Eastern Front — September – October 1943
38	24 September 1943	07:23	P-40	east of Sinyavino	40	16 October 1943	07:39	La-5	west of Gorki airfield
39	10 October 1943	12:55	P-39	PQ 35 Ost 07743					
– 2. Staffel of Jagdgeschwader 54 – Eastern Front — December 1943 – January 1944
41	15 December 1943	12:32	La-5	PQ 35 Ost 06178	45	6 January 1944	11:03	La-5	PQ 35 Ost 96663
42	23 December 1943	11:21	Il-2	PQ 35 Ost 06871	46	6 January 1944	11:04	La-5	PQ 35 Ost 96691
43	4 January 1944	11:40	LaGG-3	PQ 35 Ost 06871	47	12 January 1944	14:42	Pe-2	PQ 35 Ost 06553
44	5 January 1944	12:30	La-5	PQ 35 Ost 06884					
– 3. Staffel of Jagdgeschwader 54 – Eastern Front — October – 21 December 1944
48	29 October 1944	13:34	P-39	PQ 25 Ost 27499 south-southwest of Tukums	52	7 November 1944	14:25	Il-2	PQ 25 Ost 17481; 40 km (25 mi) east of Libau
49	30 October 1944	11:05	P-39	PQ 25 Ost 17655; 45 km (28 mi) southeast of Libau	53	7 November 1944	14:26	Il-2	PQ 25 Ost 17482; 40 km (25 mi) east of Libau
50	30 October 1944	14:40	Yak-9	PQ 25 Ost 17639; 55 km (34 mi) east-southeast of Libau	54	7 November 1944	14:27	Il-2	PQ 25 Ost 17483; 40 km (25 mi) east of Libau
51	30 October 1944	14:47	P-39	PQ 25 Ost 17625; 45 km (28 mi) east-southeast of Libau					
According to Prien, Stemmer, Balke and Bock, Kroschinski claimed four undocumented aerial victories in November and December 1944. Mathews and Foreman list three claims of unknown type on 15 December 1944.
#?	18 November 1944	—	Pe-2		? (Note: This claim is not listed by Prien, Stemmer, Balke and Bock.)	15 December 1944	—	unknown	
#?	18 November 1944	—	Pe-2		?	15 December 1944	—	unknown	
#	23 November 1944	10:06	Yak-9	PQ 25 Ost 28117; 35 km (22 mi) southwest of Arensburg	65	21 December 1944	—	Pe-2	south of Frauenburg
62?	14 December 1944	—	Pe-2		66	21 December 1944	—	Pe-2	south of Frauenburg
63?	14 December 1944	—	Pe-2		?	21 December 1944	—	Pe-2	south of Frauenburg
64?	14 December 1944	—	unknown		?	21 December 1944	—	Pe-2	south of Frauenburg
?	15 December 1944	—	unknown		?	21 December 1944	—	Pe-2	south of Frauenburg

=== Awards ===
- Iron Cross (1939) 2nd and 1st Class
- Honor Goblet of the Luftwaffe on 11 October 1943 as Feldwebel and pilot
- German Cross in Gold on 27 October 1943 as Feldwebel in the 2./Jagdgeschwader 54
- Knight's Cross of the Iron Cross on 17 April 1945 as Oberfeldwebel and pilot in the 3./Jagdgeschwader 54
