= Gmina Zalewo =

Gmina Zalewo Zalewo Commune
- Gmina
- Coat of arms
- Interactive map of Gmina Zalewo
- Coordinates (Zalewo): 53°50′46″N 19°36′37″E
- Country: Poland
- Voivodeship: Warmian-Masurian
- County: Iława
- Seat: Zalewo

Area
  - Total: 254.34 km^{2} (98.20 sq mi)

Population (2006)
  - Total: 6,986
  - Density: 27.47/km^{2} (71.14/sq mi)
  - Urban: 2,152
  - Rural: 4,834
- Website: http://www.zalewo.pl

Gmina Zalewo is an urban-rural gmina (administrative district) in Iława County, Warmian-Masurian Voivodeship, in northern Poland. Its seat is the town of Zalewo, which lies approximately 28 kilometres (17 mi) north of Iława and 59 km (37 mi) west of the regional capital Olsztyn.

The gmina covers an area of 254.34 square kilometres (98.2 sq mi), and as of 2006 its total population is 6,986 (out of which the population of Zalewo amounts to 2,152, and the population of the rural part of the gmina is 4,834).

The gmina contains part of the protected area called Iława Lake District Landscape Park.

== Villages ==
Apart from the town of Zalewo, Gmina Zalewo contains the villages and settlements of Bądki, Bajdy, Barty, Bednarzówka, Boreczno, Brzeziniak, Bukowiec, Dajny, Dobrzyki, Duba, Gajdy, Girgajny, Gubławki, Huta Wielka, Janiki Małe, Janiki Wielkie, Jaśkowo, Jerzwałd, Jezierce, Karpowo, Kiemiany, Kupin, Likszany, Matyty, Mazanki, Międzychód, Mozgowo, Murawki, Nowe Chmielówko, Piekło, Polajny, Półwieś, Pomielin, Pozorty, Rąbity, Rucewo, Rudnia, Sadławki, Skitławki, Śliwa, Surbajny, Tarpno, Urowo, Wielowieś, Wieprz, Witoszewo and Zatyki.

== Neighbouring gminas ==
Gmina Zalewo is bordered by the gminas of Iława, Małdyty, Miłomłyn, Stary Dzierzgoń and Susz.
