= Tarpno, Warmian-Masurian Voivodeship =

Tarpno
- Village
- Location within Poland
- Coordinates: 53°51′55″N 19°40′43″E
- Country: Poland
- Voivodeship: Warmian-Masurian
- County: Iława
- Gmina: Zalewo
- Population: 20
- Time zone: UTC+1 (CET)
  - Summer (DST): UTC+2 (CEST)

Tarpno [ˈtarpnɔ] is a village in the administrative district of Gmina Zalewo, within Iława County, Warmian-Masurian Voivodeship, in northern Poland.
