= Miłakowo =

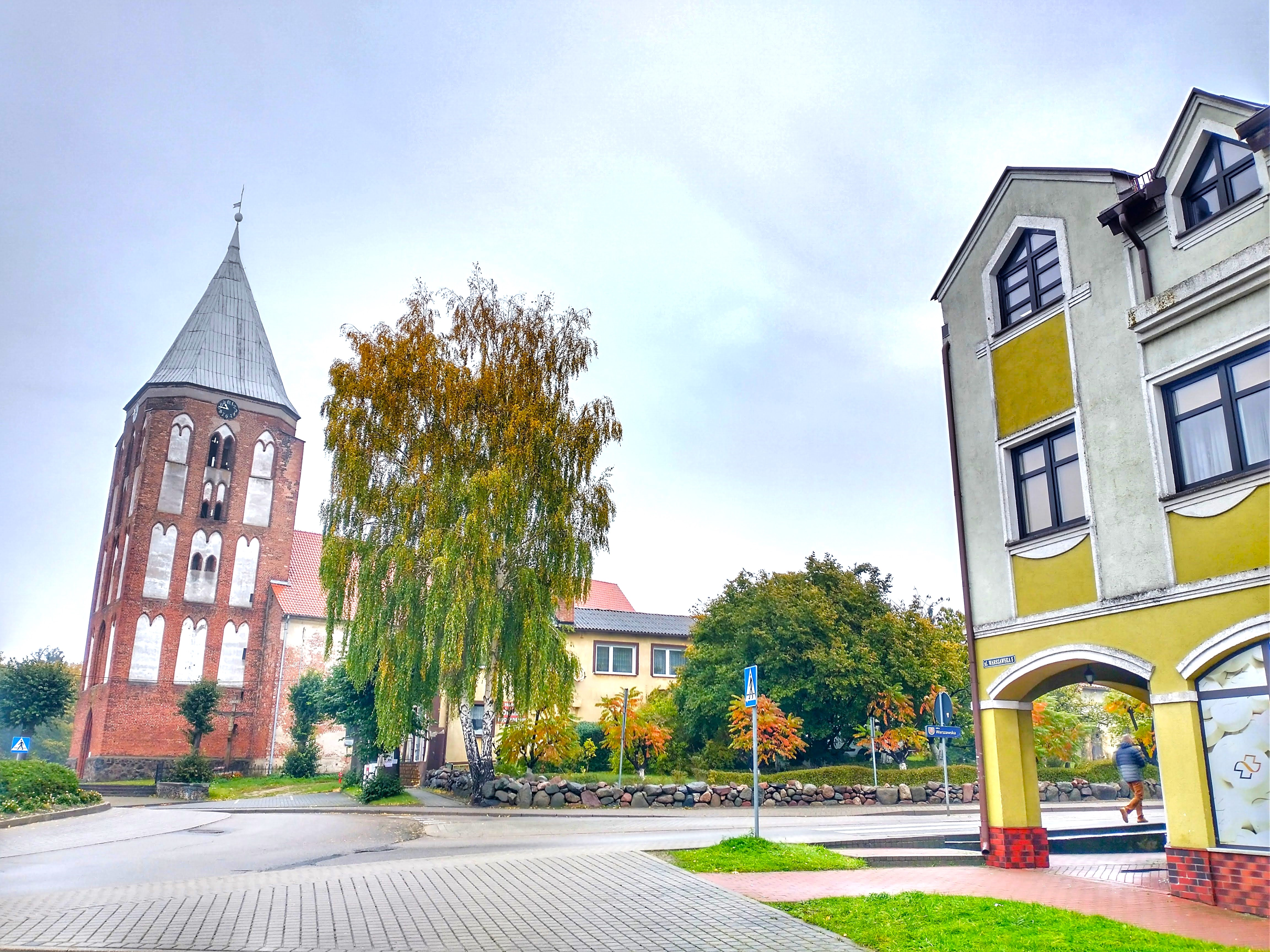
- Town center with the Saints Elisabeth and Adalbert church

- Coat of arms

- Location within Poland
- Coordinates: 54°0′N 20°4′E
- Country: Poland
- Voivodeship: Warmian-Masurian
- County: Ostróda
- Gmina: Miłakowo
- Founded: 1302

Area
  - Total: 8.68 km^{2} (3.35 sq mi)

Population (2010)
  - Total: 2,692
  - Density: 310/km^{2} (803/sq mi)
- Time zone: UTC+1 (CET)
  - Summer (DST): UTC+2 (CEST)
- Postal code: 14-310
- Vehicle registration: NOS
- Website: www.milakowo.ug.net.pl

Miłakowo [mʲiwaˈkɔvɔ] (German: Liebstadt) is a town in Ostróda County, Warmian-Masurian Voivodeship, in northern Poland, with 2,692 inhabitants (2010). It is situated on the Miłakówka River in the region of Powiśle.

The Polish noble family of Sadliński lived near the town.

== Demographics ==
Historical population

Year	Pop.	±%
1871	2,394	—
1880	2,441	+2.0%
1890	2,254	−7.7%
1900	2,127	−5.6%

Year	Pop.	±%
1910	1,926	−9.4%
1925	2,251	+16.9%
2010	2,692	+19.6%
