= Zalewo =

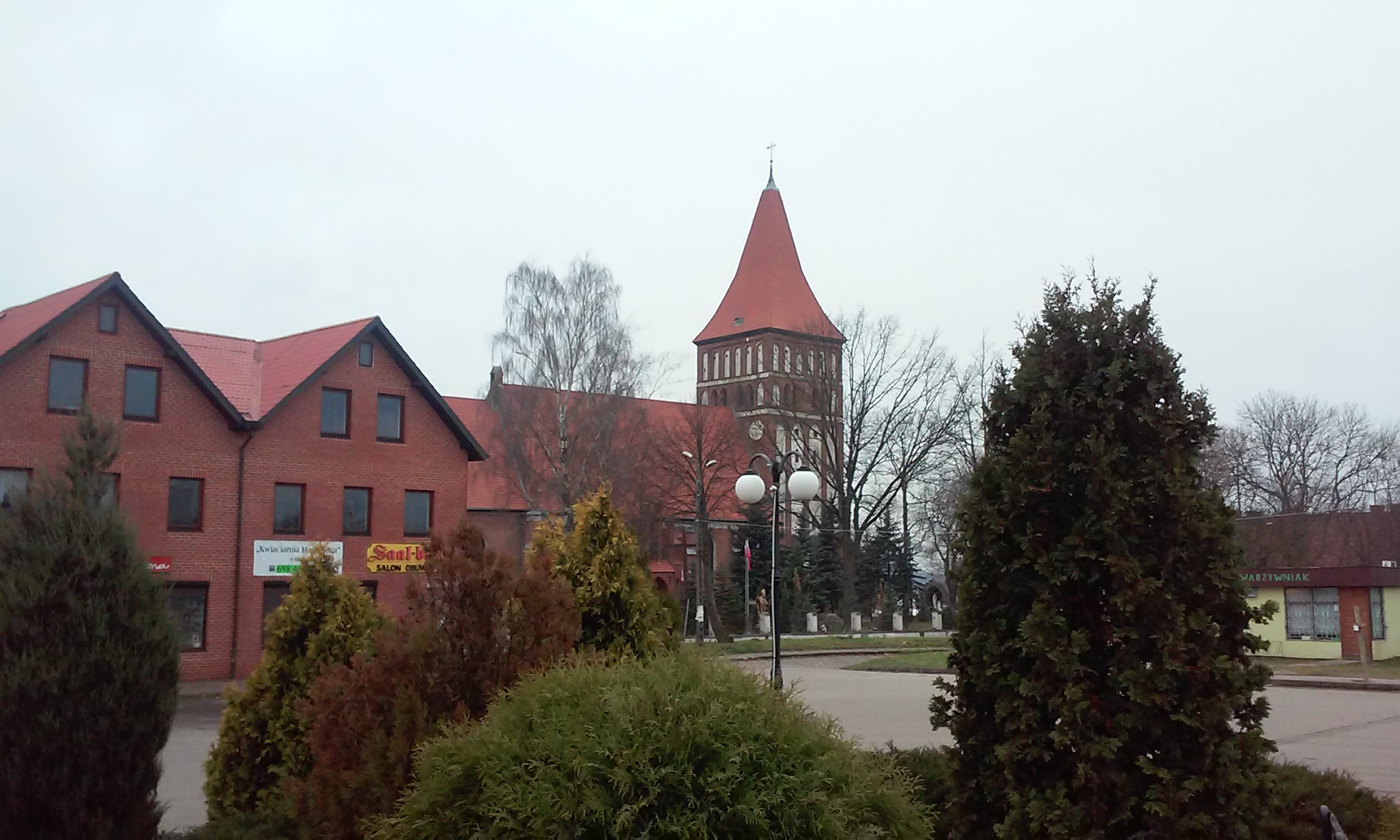
- The marketplace

- Flag Coat of arms

- Location within Poland
- Coordinates: 53°50′46″N 19°36′37″E
- Country: Poland
- Voivodeship: Warmian-Masurian
- County: Iława
- Gmina: Zalewo
- Founded: 13th century
- Town rights: 1305

Area
  - Total: 8.22 km^{2} (3.17 sq mi)

Population (2006)
  - Total: 2,977
  - Density: 362/km^{2} (938/sq mi)
- Time zone: UTC+1 (CET)
  - Summer (DST): UTC+2 (CEST)
- Postal code: 14-230
- Website: http://www.zalewo.pl

Zalewo (Polish pronunciation: [zaˈlɛvɔ]; German: Saalfeld) is a town in Iława County, Warmian-Masurian Voivodeship, Poland, with 2,977 inhabitants (2008). It is situated on the northern shore of Lake Ewingi.

== History ==
The settlement was founded in the 13th century and was granted town rights in 1305.

During the Napoleonic Wars in 1807 Polish soldiers of General Jan Henryk Dąbrowski were quartered in the town. In 1831, several Polish infantry and artillery units, engineer corps, sappers and general staff of the November Uprising stopped in the town on the way to their internment places.

During World War II it was destroyed in 70%.

== Sports ==
The local football club is Ewingi Zalewo. It competes in the lower leagues.

== Gallery ==
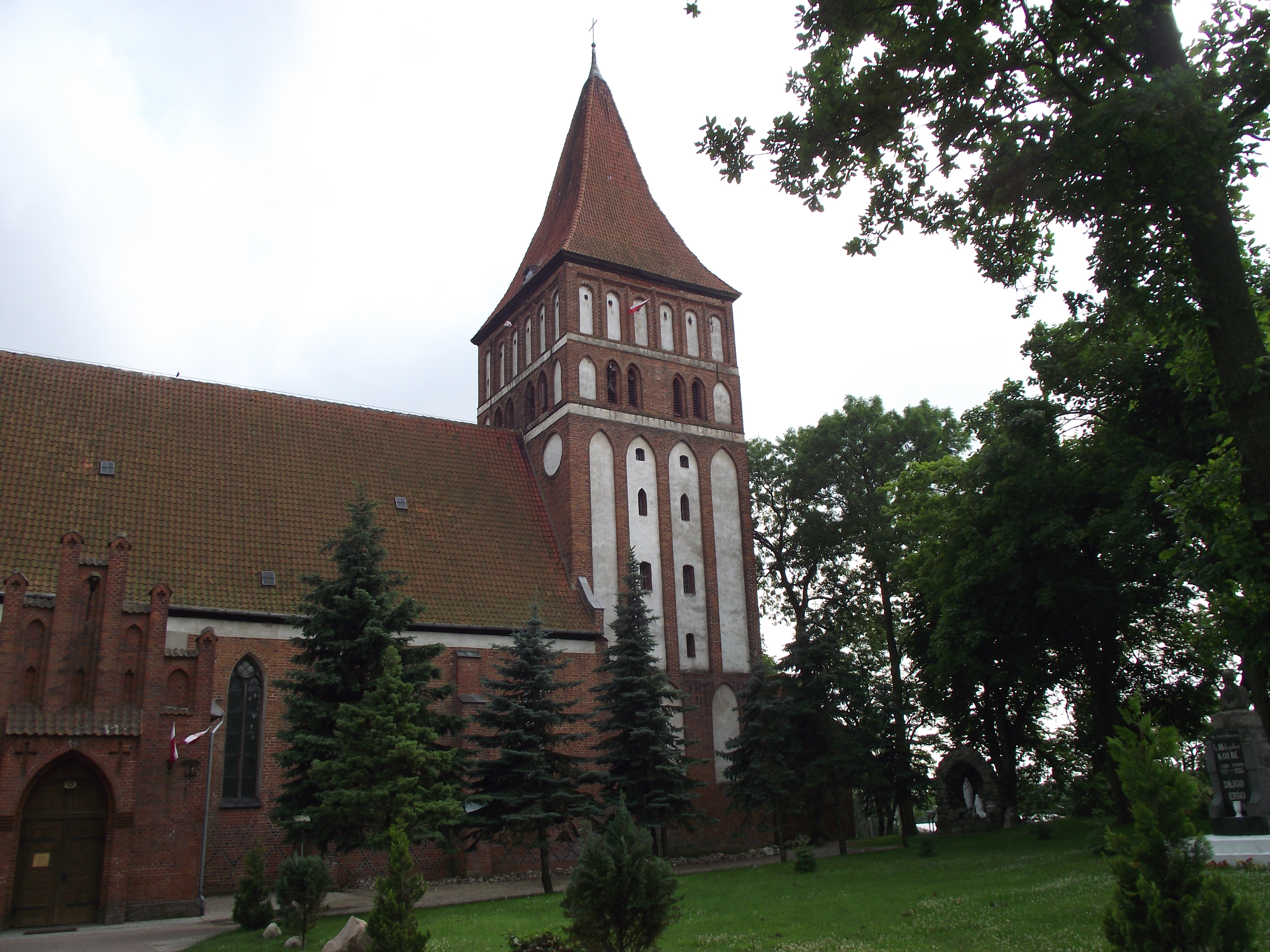
Gothic Saint John the Evangelist church

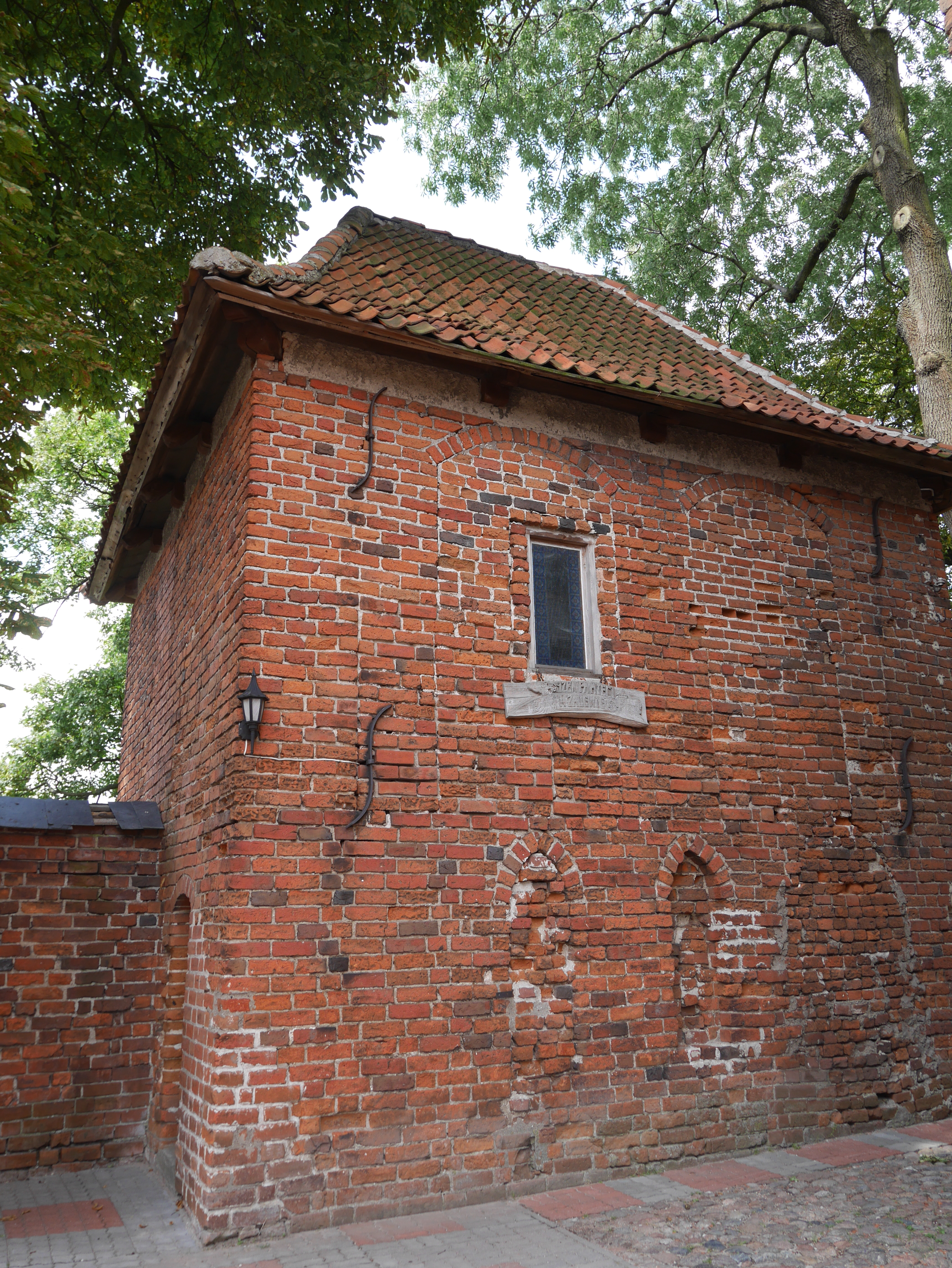
Medieval town walls

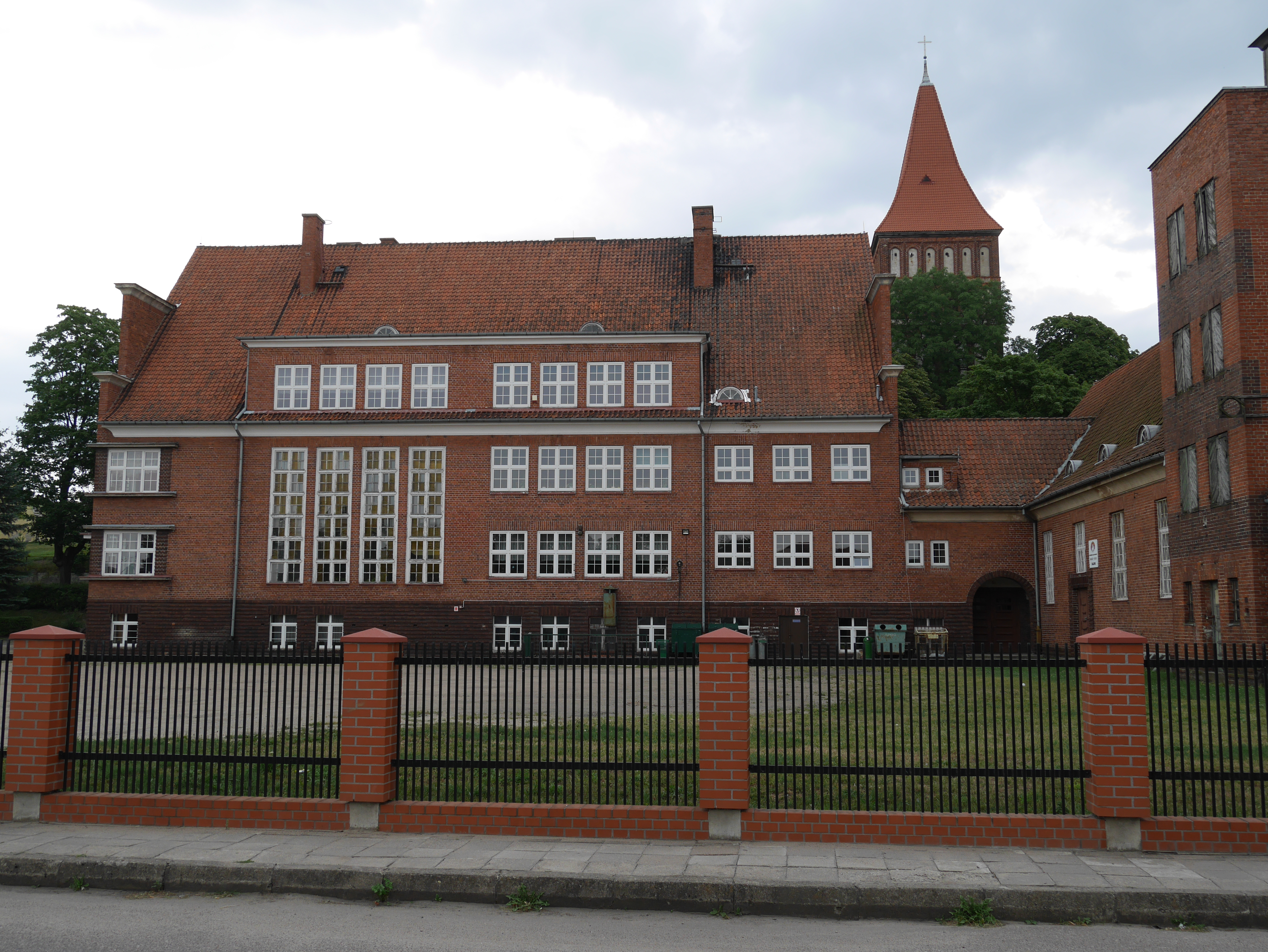
School in Zalewo

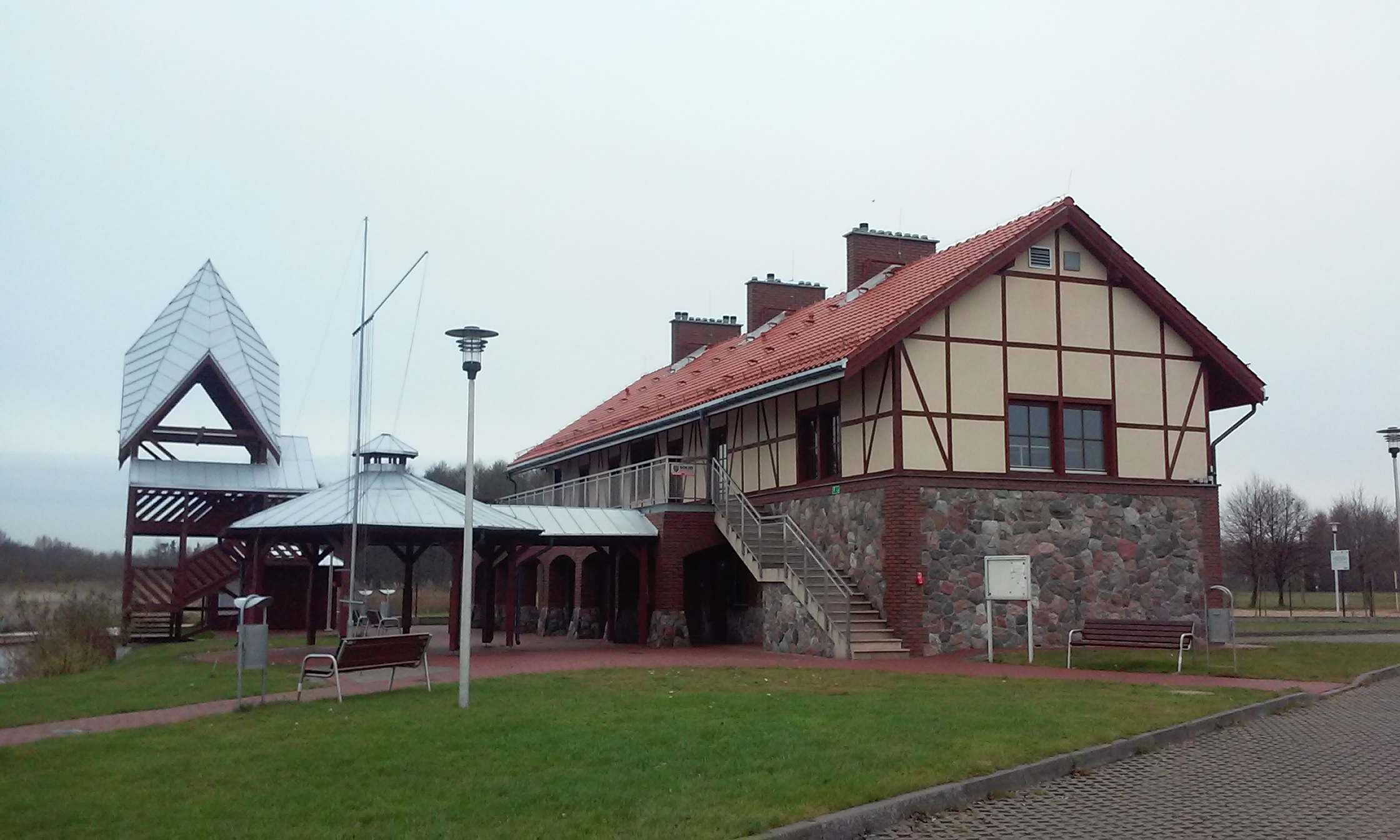
Marina

== International relations ==
=== Twin towns — Sister cities ===
- Rūdiškės, Lithuania
- Saalfeld/Saale, Germany

== Notable people ==
- Hans-Joachim Kappis (1908–1970), Wehrmacht officer
- Herbert Kelletat (1907–2007), musician, author, choir director
- Hans-Joachim Kroschinski (1920–1995), German flying ace
- Ernst Kutschkau (1910–1947) Wehrmacht soldier
- Grażyna Prokopek (born 1977), athlete
- Robert Roberthin (1600–1648), one of the first regional poets
