= Książnik =

- Village
- Location within Poland
- Coordinates: 53°58′N 20°4′E
- Country: Poland
- Voivodeship: Warmian-Masurian
- County: Ostróda
- Gmina: Miłakowo

Książnik [ˈkɕɔ̃ʐnik] is a village in the administrative district of Gmina Miłakowo, within Ostróda County, Warmian-Masurian Voivodeship, in northern Poland.
