= Wieprz, Warmian-Masurian Voivodeship =

Wieprz
- Village
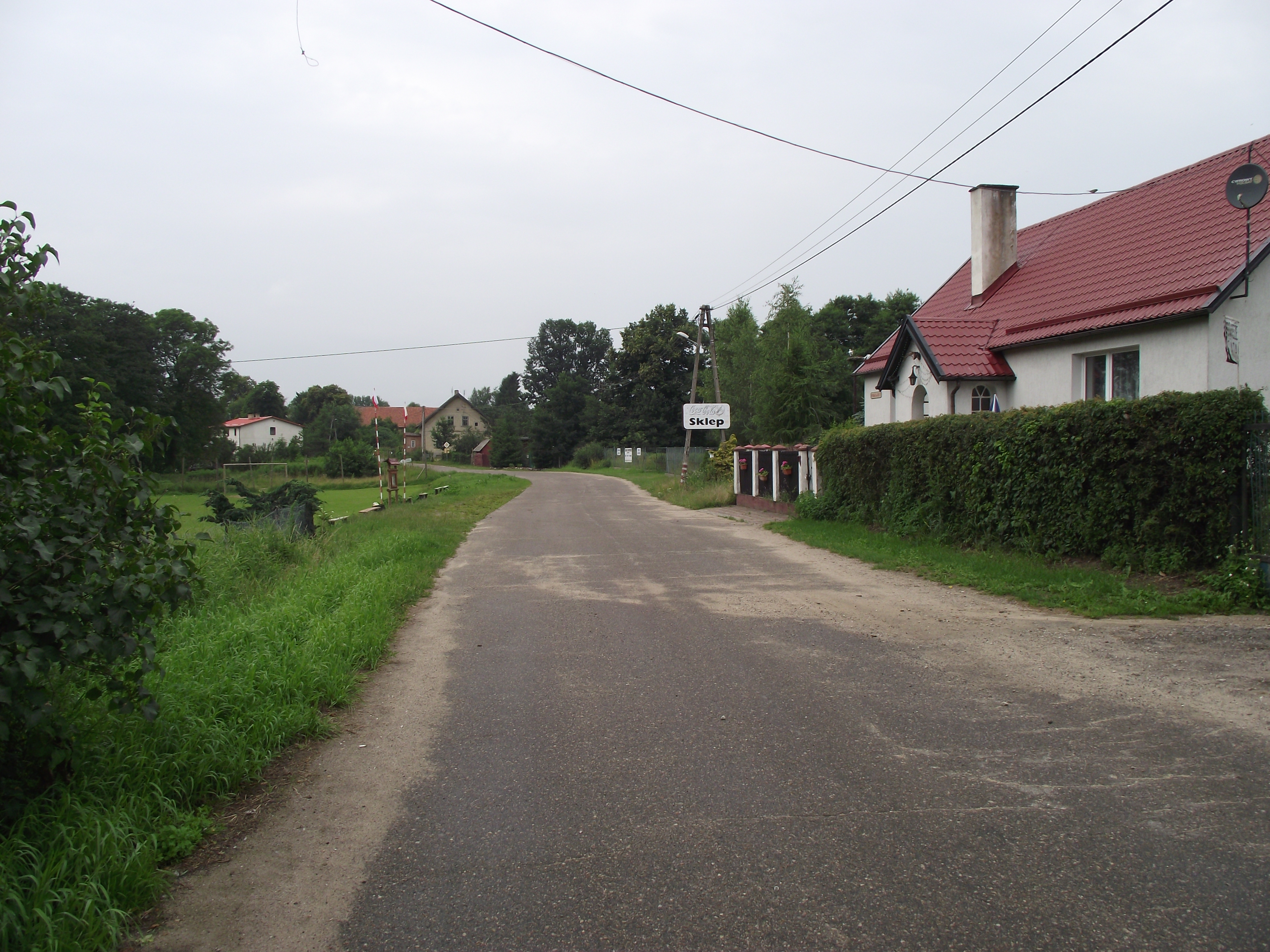
- Wieprz

- Location within Poland
- Coordinates: 53°45′N 19°38′E
- Country: Poland
- Voivodeship: Warmian-Masurian
- County: Iława
- Gmina: Zalewo
- Time zone: UTC+1 (CET)
  - Summer (DST): UTC+2 (CEST)

Wieprz Polish: [ˈvjɛpʂ], lit. '"Boar"') is a village in the administrative district of Gmina Zalewo, within Iława County, Warmian-Masurian Voivodeship, in northern Poland.

== Notable residents ==
- Dietrich Stobbe (1938–2011), German politician, former mayor of West-Berlin
