= Barty, Warmian-Masurian Voivodeship =

Barty
- Village
- Location within Poland
- Coordinates: 53°52′39″N 19°40′18″E
- Country: Poland
- Voivodeship: Warmian-Masurian
- County: Iława
- Gmina: Zalewo
- Time zone: UTC+1 (CET)
  - Summer (DST): UTC+2 (CEST)
- Vehicle registration: NIL

Barty ([ˈbartɨ]) is a village in the administrative district of Gmina Zalewo, within Iława County, Warmian–Masurian Voivodeship, in northern Poland.

On 9 June 1807, Polish troops of General Jan Henryk Dąbrowski gathered in the village before marching to Morąg.
