= Rudnya, Russia =

Rudnya (Russian: Рудня) is the name of several inhabited localities in Russia.

== Bryansk Oblast ==
As of 2010, five rural localities in Bryansk Oblast bear this name:

- Rudnya, Dubrovsky District, Bryansk Oblast, a village in Mareyevsky Selsoviet of Dubrovsky District
- Rudnya, Klimovsky District, Bryansk Oblast, a village in Plavensky Selsoviet of Klimovsky District
- Rudnya, Mglinsky District, Bryansk Oblast, a village in Shumarovsky Selsoviet of Mglinsky District
- Rudnya, Baklansky Selsoviet, Pochepsky District, Bryansk Oblast, a village in Baklansky Selsoviet of Pochepsky District
- Rudnya, Dmitrovsky Selsoviet, Pochepsky District, Bryansk Oblast, a village in Dmitrovsky Selsoviet of Pochepsky District

== Kaluga Oblast ==
As of 2010, one rural locality in Kaluga Oblast bears this name:

- Rudnya, Kaluga Oblast, a village in Dzerzhinsky District

== Nizhny Novgorod Oblast ==
As of 2010, one rural locality in Nizhny Novgorod Oblast bears this name:

- Rudnya, Nizhny Novgorod Oblast, a village in Maresevsky Selsoviet of Pochinkovsky District

== Pskov Oblast ==
As of 2010, five rural localities in Pskov Oblast bear this name:

- Rudnya, Nevelsky District, Pskov Oblast, a village in Nevelsky District
- Rudnya, Sebezhsky District, Pskov Oblast, a village in Sebezhsky District
- Rudnya, Usvyatsky District, Pskov Oblast, a village in Usvyatsky District
- Rudnya (Porechenskaya Rural Settlement), Velikoluksky District, Pskov Oblast, a village in Velikoluksky District; municipally, a part of Porechenskaya Rural Settlement of that district
- Rudnya (Borkovskaya Rural Settlement), Velikoluksky District, Pskov Oblast, a village in Velikoluksky District; municipally, a part of Borkovskaya Rural Settlement of that district

== Saratov Oblast ==
As of 2010, one rural locality in Saratov Oblast bears this name:

- Rudnya, Saratov Oblast, a selo in Krasnokutsky District

== Smolensk Oblast ==
As of 2010, seven inhabited localities in Smolensk Oblast bear this name.

Urban localities

- Rudnya, Rudnyansky District, Smolensk Oblast, a town in Rudnyansky District; administratively incorporated as Rudnyanskoye Urban Settlement

Rural localities

- Rudnya, Demidovsky District, Smolensk Oblast, a village in Slobodskoye Rural Settlement of Demidovsky District
- Rudnya, Dukhovshchinsky District, Smolensk Oblast, a village in Prechistenskoye Rural Settlement of Dukhovshchinsky District
- Rudnya, Khislavichsky District, Smolensk Oblast, a village in Gorodishchenskoye Rural Settlement of Khislavichsky District
- Rudnya, Pochinkovsky District, Smolensk Oblast, a village in Leninskoye Rural Settlement of Pochinkovsky District
- Rudnya, Velizhsky District, Smolensk Oblast, a village in Seleznevskoye Rural Settlement of Velizhsky District
- Rudnya, Yershichsky District, Smolensk Oblast, a village in Yershichskoye Rural Settlement of Yershichsky District

== Tver Oblast ==
As of 2010, two rural localities in Tver Oblast bear this name:

- Rudnya, Zapadnodvinsky District, Tver Oblast, a village in Zapadnodvinsky District
- Rudnya, Zharkovsky District, Tver Oblast, a village in Zharkovsky District

== Volgograd Oblast ==
As of 2010, one urban locality in Volgograd Oblast bears this name:

- Rudnya, Volgograd Oblast, a work settlement in Rudnyansky District

== Voronezh Oblast ==
As of 2010, one rural locality in Voronezh Oblast bears this name:

- Rudnya, Voronezh Oblast, a selo in Rudnyanskoye Rural Settlement of Vorobyovsky District
