= Rudnya, Brest district =

Village in Brest Region, Belarus

Rudnya Рудня
- Village
- Location within Belarus
- Coordinates: 51°44′15″N 23°40′30″E
- Country: Belarus
- Region: Brest Region
- District: Brest District

Population (2023)
  - Total: 35
- Time zone: UTC+3 (MSK)

Rudnya (Belarusian: Рудня, romanized: Rudnia; Russian: Рудня) is a village in Brest District, Brest Region, Belarus. It is part of Damachava rural council (selsoviet). As of 2023, it has a population of 35.

It is situated by the Kopajowka River.
