= Jaśkowo, Iława County =

Jaśkowo
- Village
- Location within Poland
- Coordinates: 53°48′N 19°44′E
- Country: Poland
- Voivodeship: Warmian-Masurian
- County: Iława
- Gmina: Zalewo
- Population: 110
- Time zone: UTC+1 (CET)
  - Summer (DST): UTC+2 (CEST)

Jaśkowo [jaɕˈkɔvɔ] (de:Jäskendorf) is a village in the administrative district of Gmina Zalewo, within Iława County, Warmian-Masurian Voivodeship, in northern Poland.

== People ==
- Count Karl Bonaventura Finck von Finckenstein (1794-1865), Prussian count and land owner
- Konrad Karl Finck von Finckenstein (1820-1900), Prussian count, land owner and politician
