= Roje, Poland =

Roje Royen Rogin
- Village
- Location within Poland
- Coordinates: 53°58′N 20°1′E
- Country: Poland
- Voivodeship: Warmian-Masurian
- County: Ostróda
- Gmina: Miłakowo

Roje (German name: Royen) is a village in Gmina Miłakowo, Ostróda County, Warmian-Masurian Voivodeship, in northern Poland.

== History ==
The village was mentioned in documents from 1325 as a Prussian village of about 8 włókas. In 1782, there were 14 houses in the village, while in 1858 there were 152 inhabitants and 20 households. In the years 1937 to 39 the number dropped 113 inhabitants and in 1973, the village belonged to Morąg County, Miłakowo Commune, Boguchwała Post Office.

== Nature ==
There is a 123 metres (404 ft) hill called Round Mountain (Polish: Okrągła Góra; German: Kugelsberg), located 2 kilometres (1.2 mi) north of Roje. East of Roje, there is a forest called Royen forest (Polish: Rojski Las; German: Royer Wald)
