= Jerzwałd =

- Village
- Location within Poland
- Coordinates: 53°46′53″N 19°31′40″E
- Country: Poland
- Voivodeship: Warmian-Masurian
- County: Iława
- Gmina: Zalewo
- Population: 370
- Time zone: UTC+1 (CET)
  - Summer (DST): UTC+2 (CEST)

Jerzwałd [ˈjɛʐvau̯t] is a village in the administrative district of Gmina Zalewo, within Iława County, Warmian-Masurian Voivodeship, in northern Poland.

The village is also the headquarters of the Landscape Parks Complex called "Iława Lake District Landscape Park", Dylewo Hills Landscape Park. The famous Polish writer Zbigniew Nienacki (1929 – 1994) lived and died here. His grave is located in the local cemetery. His house can be still found in the village, marked by a plaque. The village and its inhabitants are the prototype for the village Skiroławki described in the artist's novel entitled Once a year in Skiroławki (Raz do roku w Skiroławkach).

== History ==
Before the arrival of the Teutonic Knights, Jerzwałd as we know it today, belonged to the Prussian "Geriowie" brood, whose territory reached from the village of Karpowo to Jerzwałd including the Central Lagoon. After the Geriowie migrated they left some settlements in the lands of "Koziny" and Dobrzyki as well as defensive earthen shafts in the Karpiarnia area, near Witoszewskie Lake, and also in the area between Dobrzyki and Likszany. An enclosed cremation graveyard can be found near the village; it is said to have been built in the period of the early Middle Ages.

The Prussian peoples on Jerzwałd's lands were generally farmers and breeders. They grew oats, barley, rye and wheat. In terms of breeding each settled Prussian family mainly had its own horses (they were very numerous at the time) but also its own cattle, sheep, goats and even bees. Besides breeding, Prussian men were known for their hunting and fishing skills. Carpentry was a well known art to the Prussian people: they used to craft items from animal bones and horns.

Formerly, on Jerzwałd's lands, there was a Prussian village called Keysy (the name was taken from the name of the founder). Commander Dzierzgoński, Luther of Brunswick, granted Skipiele (Skypelo) and his successors 10 fishing trawlers on the land of Keyserswalde (later Gerswalde / Gerswalden). The catch was free from tithes. In 1333, the document which stipulated the latter was renovated, and the Grand Master granted Skipiele and his successors the permission to create small and large settlements, as well as fish rights using "small equipment" for their own needs in both the Rucewskie (Large Rucewo, Small Rucewo) and Jeziorak lakes. In exchange they had to contribute some wheat and rye from each plow to the Grand Master. He also sent Skipiele one military division (serving in Prussian armor).

Shortly afterwards the lands of Jerzwałd, which were slightly larger than Skypelon's fields, received two Prussians, Lutyne and his brother Warpune, from the Teutonic Knights. This was recorded in the 2 January 1343 Act. The latter also states that the Grand Master Ludolf Koenig gave the faithful Lutyne and his brother Warpune two villages: Keyserswalde and Luxeine, in exchange for the goods which they owned in the village of Doythimiten. Each village had an obligation to serve in the Prussian military. Records since 1437 fail to mention whether this military obligation continued.
