= Martin Albertz =

German clergyman, resistance fighter and teacher

Martin Albertz

Martin Albertz (7.5.1882, Halle, Saxony-Anhalt – 29.12.1956 in Berlin) was a German clergyman, resistance fighter, and teacher. As Superintendent of the deanery of Spandau (German: Kirchenkreis Spandau) within the Evangelical Church of the old-Prussian Union he—clinging to the Confessing Church—opposed the Nazis. He was imprisoned by the Nazis during the Second World War for his church activities. He was the half-brother of theologian and politician Heinrich Albertz.
