= Heinrich Albertz =

German Protestant theologian and politician (1915–1993)

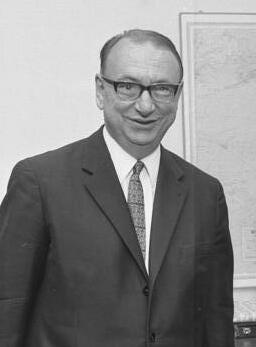
- Mayor Albertz, December 1966

Governing Mayor of Berlin (West Berlin)
- In office 14 December 1966 – 19 October 1967
- President: Heinrich Lübke
- Chancellor: Ludwig Erhard; Kurt Georg Kiesinger
- Preceded by: Willy Brandt
- Succeeded by: Klaus Schütz

Personal details
- Born: 22 January 1915 Breslau, Silesia, Prussia, Germany
- Died: 18 May 1993 (aged 78) Bremen, Germany
- Party: Social Democratic Party

Heinrich Albertz (22 January 1915 – 18 May 1993) was a German Protestant theologian, priest and politician of the Social Democratic Party (SPD). He served as Governing Mayor of Berlin (West Berlin) from 1966 to 1967.

== Life ==
Heinrich Albertz was born in Breslau (present-day Wrocław, Poland), in the Prussian province of Silesia, to the court preacher and consistorial councilor Hugo Albertz and his second wife Elisabeth, née Meinhof. His elder half brother was the Resistance fighter Martin Albertz. Having obtained his baccalaureate (Abitur) in 1933, he went on to study theology at the universities of Breslau, Halle and Berlin. Under the Nazi regime, he maintained contact to circles of the banned Social Democratic Party. As a member of the Confessing Church opposing the Nazis, he showed solidarity with the imprisoned pastor Martin Niemöller, was arrested several times and finally conscripted into the Wehrmacht in 1941.

After World War II Albertz moved to Celle, where the British occupation authorities entrusted him with the reception of expellees and displaced persons. He joined the SPD and in 1946 became a member of the Landtag of Lower Saxony. In 1948 he was appointed minister for expellee affairs in the Lower Saxon state cabinet under Minister-President Hinrich Wilhelm Kopf; in 1951 he became state minister of social affairs. Since 1950 he was also a member of the SPD federal board.

He was a Christian pacifist and opposed the production and placement of nuclear weapons on German soil.

When the Kopf cabinet was succeeded by the right-wing government of Minister-President Heinrich Hellwege upon the 1955 state elections, Albertz continued his career as a state secretary under the West Berlin mayor Otto Suhr. In 1961 he became Senator (minister) of the Interior under Mayor Willy Brandt and deputy mayor in 1963. When Brandt joined the German grand coalition government of Chancellor Kurt Georg Kiesinger, Albertz succeeded him and was elected governing mayor of West Berlin by the Abgeordnetenhaus parliament on 14 December 1966.

Albertz, standing in the shadow of his popular predecessor, led the Social Democrats into the following state election held on 12 March 1967. Nevertheless, the SPD was able to maintain its absolute majority. Albertz' term in office was characterized by the rising student revolts culminating during the state visit by Shah Mohammad Reza Pahlavi and his wife Farah Pahlavi. On 2 June 1967, Pahlavi was received in West Berlin, accompanied by violent clashes of protesters with Iranian secret police collaborators and massive police forces, whereby the student Benno Ohnesorg was shot by police officer Karl-Heinz Kurras, an incident that became a turning point in the devolution of the German student movement. On 28 September Mayor Albertz was forced to resign after an investigation into the police's role in the killing. The Abgeordnetenhaus elected Klaus Schütz his successor.

From 1970 he worked as a pastor, from 1974 to 1979 in Berlin-Zehlendorf. When on 27 February 1975 the Movement 2 June militant group (named after the obit of Benno Ohnesorg) abducted the Christian Democrat candidate for Mayor of West Berlin Peter Lorenz, Albertz agreed to accompany the exchanged prisoners, among them Verena Becker and Gabriele Kröcher-Tiedemann, on their flight to South Yemen. Retired in 1979, he joined the German peace movement of the 1980s and several protests against the NATO Double-Track Decision.

Albertz died in a Bremen nursing home on 18 May 1993.

Political offices
| Preceded by Willy Brandt | Mayor of West Berlin; 1966–1967 | Succeeded by Klaus Schütz |
