= Stare Bolity =

- Village
- Location within Poland
- Coordinates: 53°59′N 20°3′E
- Country: Poland
- Voivodeship: Warmian-Masurian
- County: Ostróda
- Gmina: Miłakowo

Stare Bolity [ˈstarɛ bɔˈlitɨ] is a village in the administrative district of Gmina Miłakowo, within Ostróda County, Warmian-Masurian Voivodeship, in northern Poland.
