= Gmina Miłakowo =

Gmina Miłakowo Miłakowo Commune
- Gmina
- Coat of arms
- Interactive map of Gmina Miłakowo
- Coordinates (Miłakowo): 54°0′N 20°4′E
- Country: Poland
- Voivodeship: Warmian-Masurian
- County: Ostróda
- Seat: Miłakowo

Area
  - Total: 159.36 km^{2} (61.53 sq mi)

Population (2006)
  - Total: 5,736
  - Density: 35.99/km^{2} (93.22/sq mi)
  - Urban: 2,665
  - Rural: 3,071
- Website: http://www.milakowo.ug.net.pl/

Gmina Miłakowo is an urban-rural gmina (administrative district) in Ostróda County, Warmian-Masurian Voivodeship, in northern Poland. Its seat is the town of Miłakowo, which lies approximately 34 kilometres (21 mi) north of Ostróda and 38 km (24 mi) north-west of the regional capital Olsztyn.

The gmina covers an area of 159.36 square kilometres (61.5 sq mi), and as of 2006 its total population is 5,736 (out of which the population of Miłakowo amounts to 2,665, and the population of the rural part of the gmina is 3,071).

== Villages ==
Apart from the town of Miłakowo, Gmina Miłakowo contains the villages and settlements of Bieniasze, Boguchwały, Gilginie, Głodówko, Gudniki, Henrykowo, Kłodzin, Klugajny, Książnik, Miejski Dwór, Mysłaki, Naryjski Młyn, Niegławki, Nowe Mieczysławy, Pityny, Pojezierce, Polkajny, Ponary, Raciszewo, Roje, Różnowo, Rycerzewo, Sąglewo, Stare Bolity, Trokajny, Warkałki, Warkały, Warny and Wojciechy.

== Neighbouring gminas ==
Gmina Miłakowo is bordered by the gminas of Godkowo, Lubomino, Morąg, Orneta and Świątki.
