= Boguchwały =

- Village
- Location within Poland
- Coordinates: 53°55′N 20°6′E
- Country: Poland
- Voivodeship: Warmian-Masurian
- County: Ostróda
- Gmina: Miłakowo

Boguchwały [bɔɡuxˈfawɨ] is a village in the administrative district of Gmina Miłakowo, within Ostróda County, Warmian-Masurian Voivodeship, in northern Poland.
