= Barten (surname) =

Barten is a surname. Notable people with the surname include:

- Anton Barten (1930–2016), Dutch economist
- Franz Barten (1912–1944), German World War II fighter pilot
- Herb Barten (born 1928), American middle-distance runner
- Mike Barten (born 1973), German footballer and manager
