= Lake Ruda Woda =

Lake in Poland

Ruda Woda
- Duckie, Dudzkie
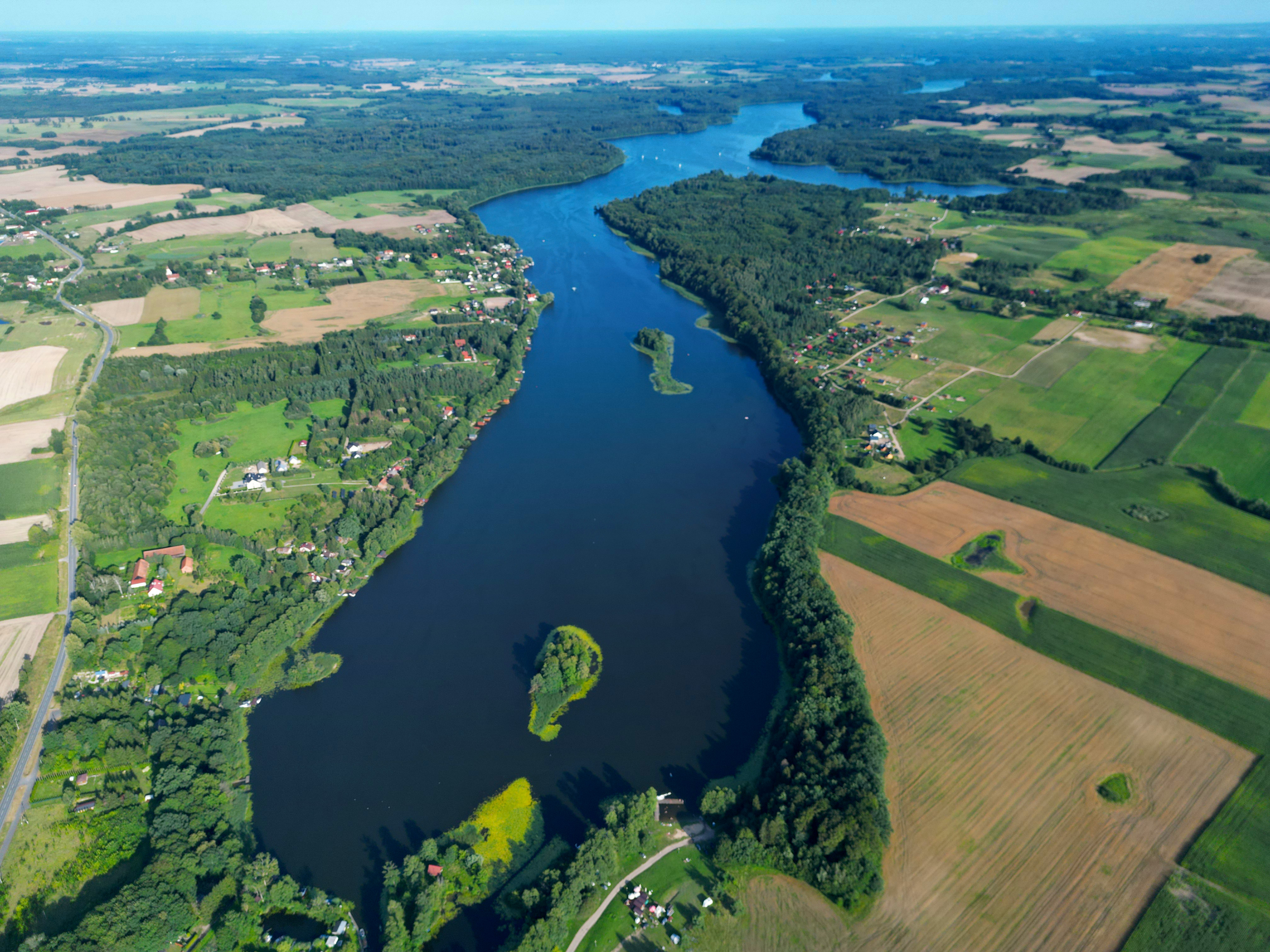
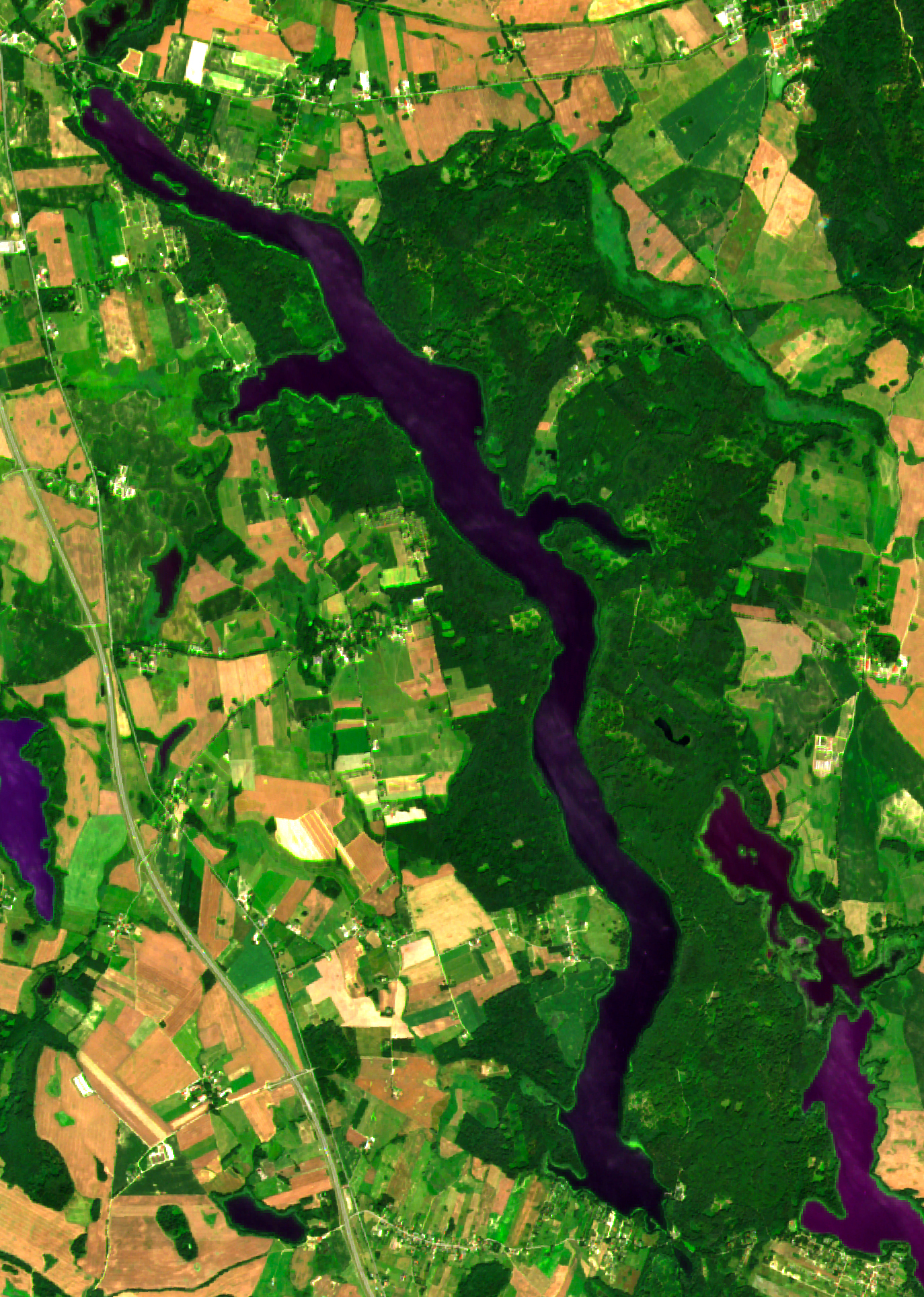
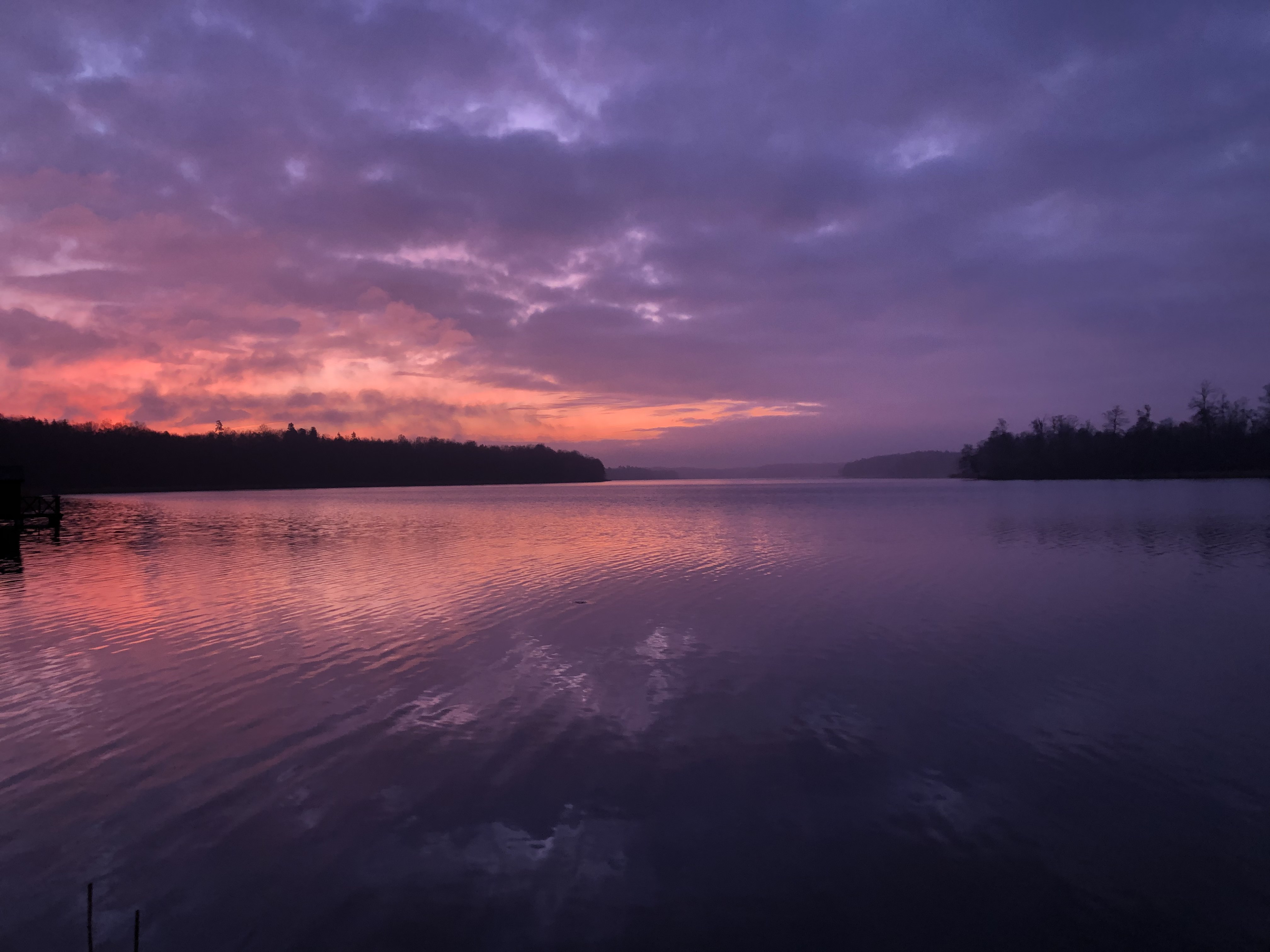
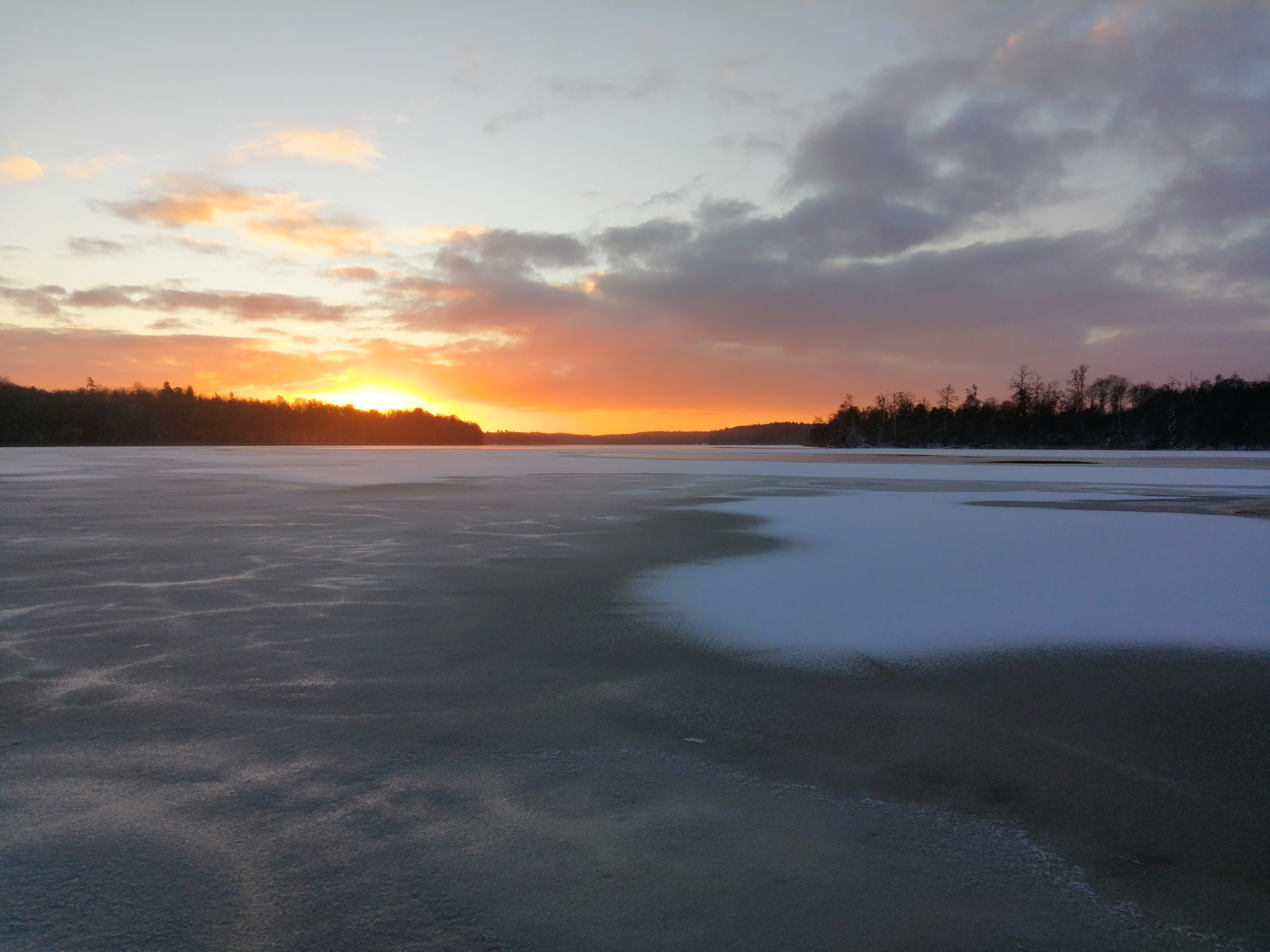
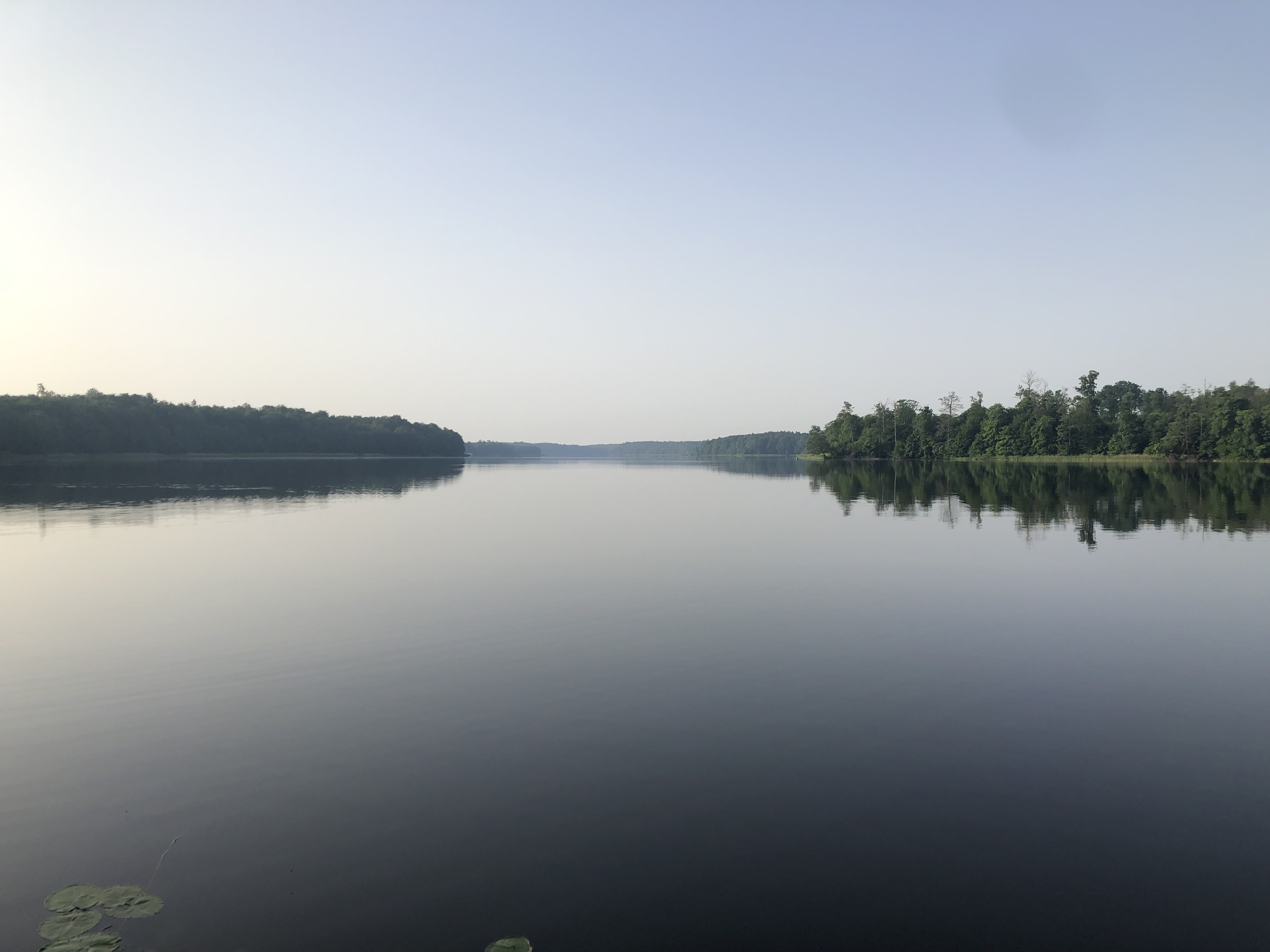
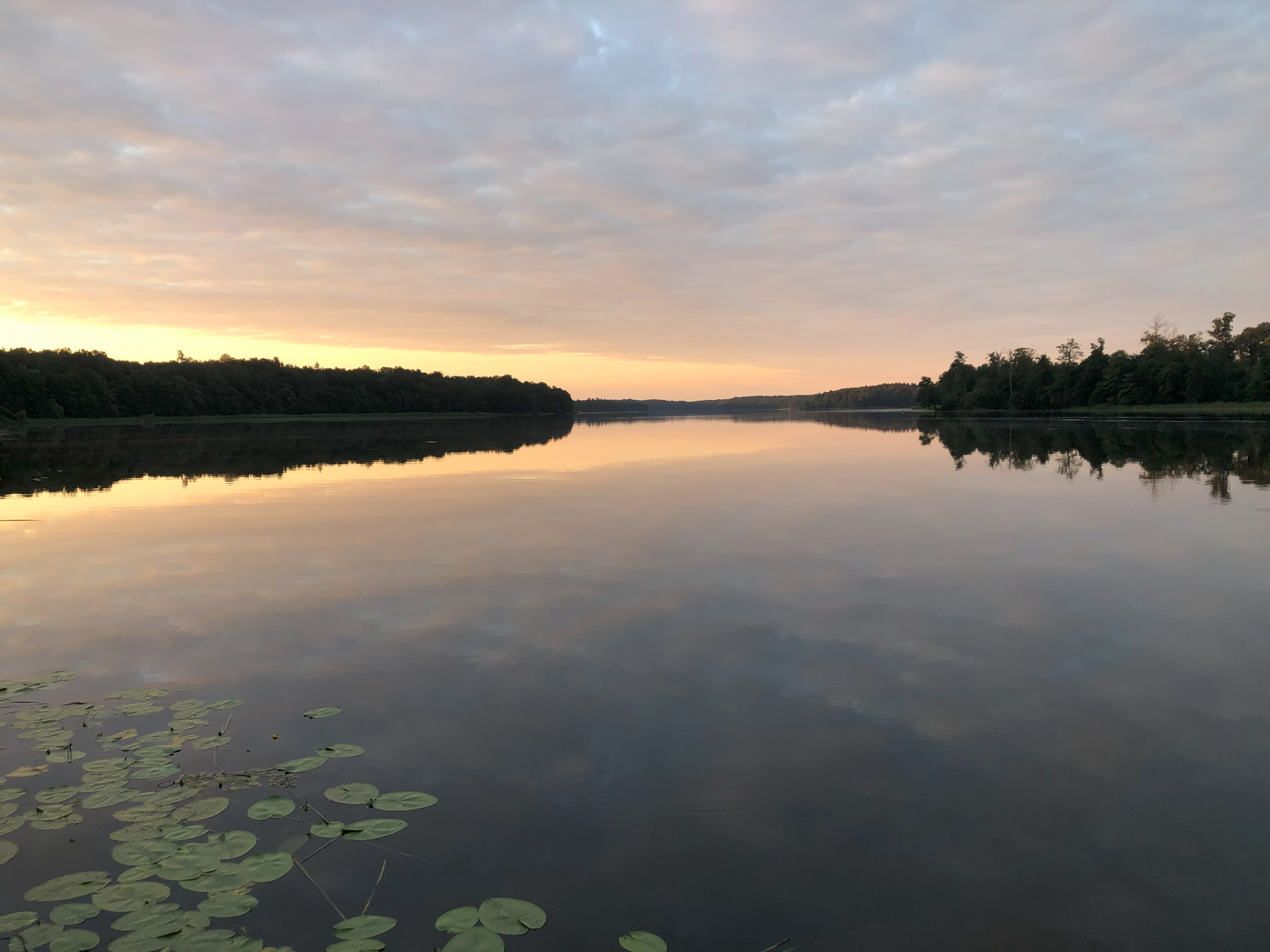
- Top: Panorama of northern part of Lake Ruda Woda, near the entrance to the Elbląg Canal; Middle: Sentinel-2 satellite image of the lake, June 2024; Bottom: Seasonal changes over the lake near the village of Wilamowo

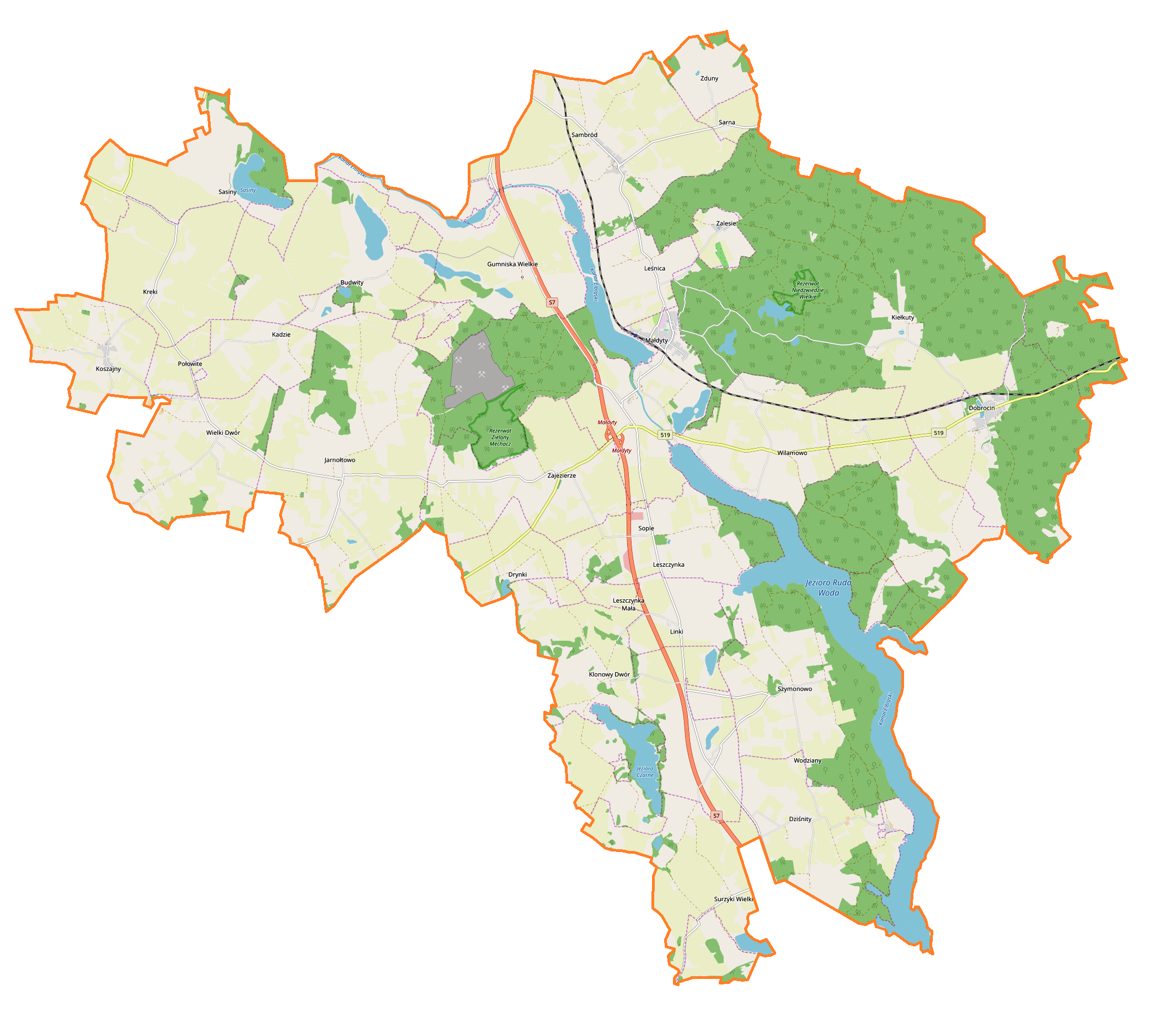
- Location within Poland Location within Gmina Małdyty
- Location: Powiśle
- Coordinates: 53.86°N 19.81°E
- Type: Ribbon lake
- Primary inflows: Drela
- Basin countries: Poland
- Max. length: 12.01 km (7.46 mi)
- Max. width: 1.65 km (1.03 mi)
- Min. width: 0.286 km (0.178 mi)
- Surface area: 6.134 km^{2} (2.368 sq mi)
- Average depth: 10.3 m (34 ft)
- Max. depth: 27.4 m (90 ft)
- Shore length^{1}: 35.8 km (22.2 mi)
- Surface elevation: 99.5 m (326 ft)
- Islands: 7
- ^{1} Shore length is not a well-defined measure.

Lake Ruda Woda ([ˈruda vɔda]; German: Röthloff See) is a long freshwater ribbon lake in Powiśle region in northern Poland. The lake lies entirely within Gmina Małdyty in Warmian-Masurian Voivodeship and is an integral part of the Elbląg Canal. Stretching 12 kilometres (7.5 mi) in length, the lake features four distinct bays and several islands. The lakebed is diverse, with numerous depressions and shallows. Shores are mostly high and steep, surrounded by temperate deciduous forest, with only the southern and northern parts bordered by fields and meadows.

Lake’s surroundings are sparsely populated with several villages located nearby, including Wilamowo, Szymonowo, Szymonówko, Sople and Liksajny.

The lake provides fishing and recreation opportunities, including sailing, kayaking and jet skiing. Several public piers scatter around the lake facility access to convenient entry points for swimming and sunbathing. Scouting camp is located in the northern part of the lake.

== Name ==
The name "Ruda Woda" (literally meaning "red/rusty water") was assigned in 1950 by the Polish Commission for the Determination of Place Names. The commission, which operated after World War II under the Ministry of Public Administration, was tasked with creating toponyms for locations, villages, towns, and cities in the former eastern territories of Germany.

One of the earliest preserved mentions of the original German name of the lake—Röthloff (or Roethloff) See —appears in 16th-century historical documents, although the name must have been in use much earlier. The name Röthloff is found in a document from the Teutonic Order dated 1522, in which Grand Master Albert granted fishing rights on Lake Röthloff to brothers Paul and Wolf Fasolt from Iława. This name also appears on a 16th-century map of the Oberland region of Prussia by Caspar Henneberg from 1576.

The etymology of the name Röthloff See is not precisely known. The name may derive from the German surname Rothloff or many of its variants including Ruttloff, Rutlaf, Roltloff, and Rotleff. Notably, the first part of the name can be traced to the Old Germanic word "rot," meaning red, which influenced the Polish name given after World War II.

An unofficial but commonly used name for the lake is "Lake Duckie / Dudzkie" (IPA: dut͡skʲɛ). This name originates from the Ducki Canal (German: Dutzkanal), which links Lake Ruda Woda to Lake Bartężek, located to the southeast.

== Geography and hydrography ==
=== Geological history ===
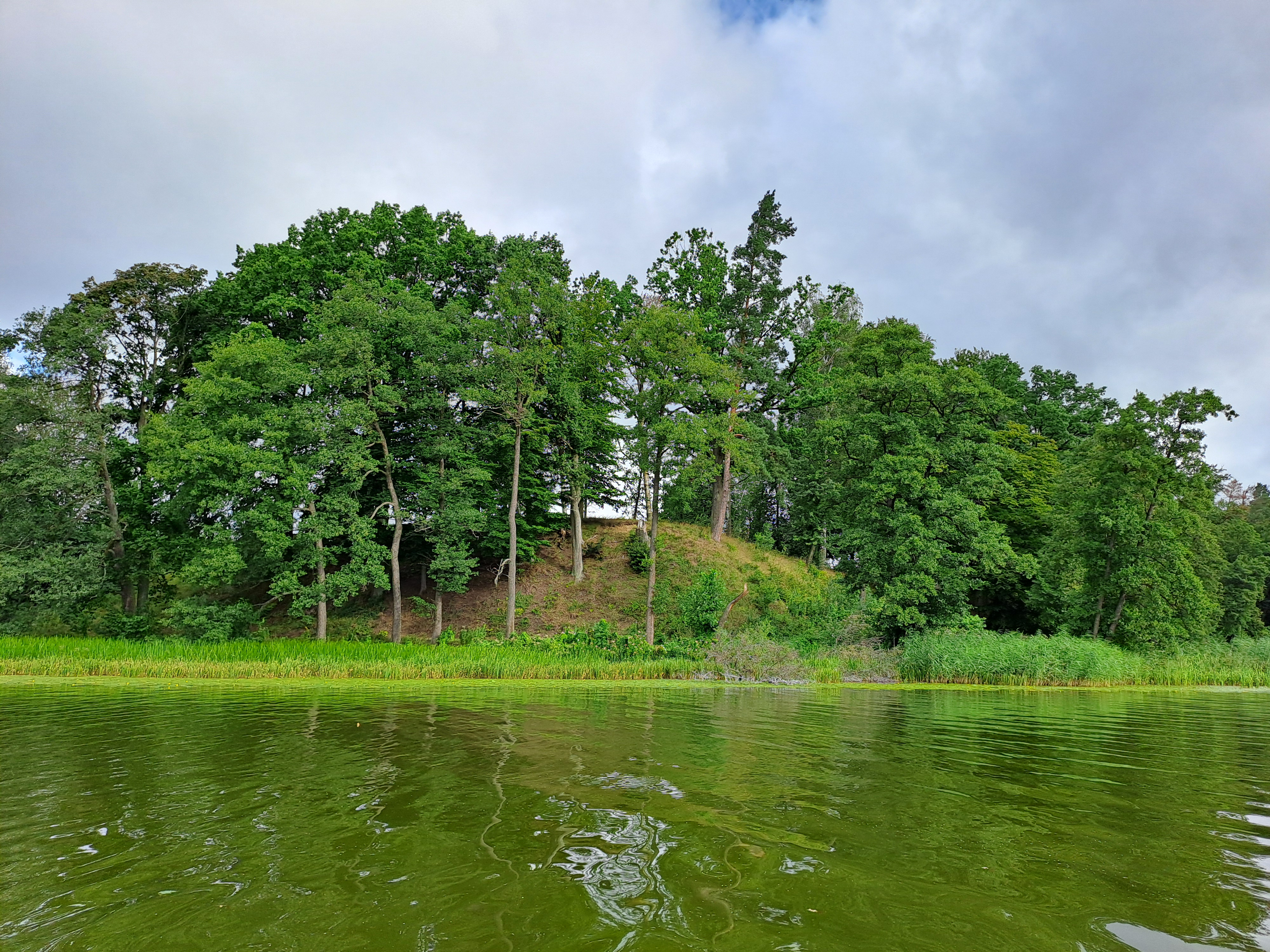
Example of terminal moraine located in the southern part of Lake Ruda Woda

Lake Ruda Woda is an example of a ribbon lake formed in central Europe during the final phase of the most recent glaciation, approximately 14,000-12,000 years ago. As rivers flowed beneath the retreating glacier, they encountered softer rock, carving out deep channels known as glacial troughs. With the warming climate, blocks of dead ice melted, leaving behind long, narrow, and relatively deep lakes. The chain of lakes, including Sambód, Ruda Woda, Ilińsk, and Drwęckie, reflects the course of the local post-glacial trough. The melting glacier deposited layers of clay, sand, and gravel and created sequences of moraine hills, which are visible in the southern part of the lake.

=== Geography ===
Ruda Woda Lake is located in northern Poland, within the macroregion of the Pojezierze Iławskie (Iława Lake District), which is ethnographically classified as part of the Powiśle region. Historically, this area belonged to the German province of Upper Prussia (German: Oberland). The region is sometimes mistakenly considered part of Masuria, specifically the Western Masuria, which is neither a distinct geographic nor ethnographic region but rather a tourist brand

=== Morphometry and morphology ===
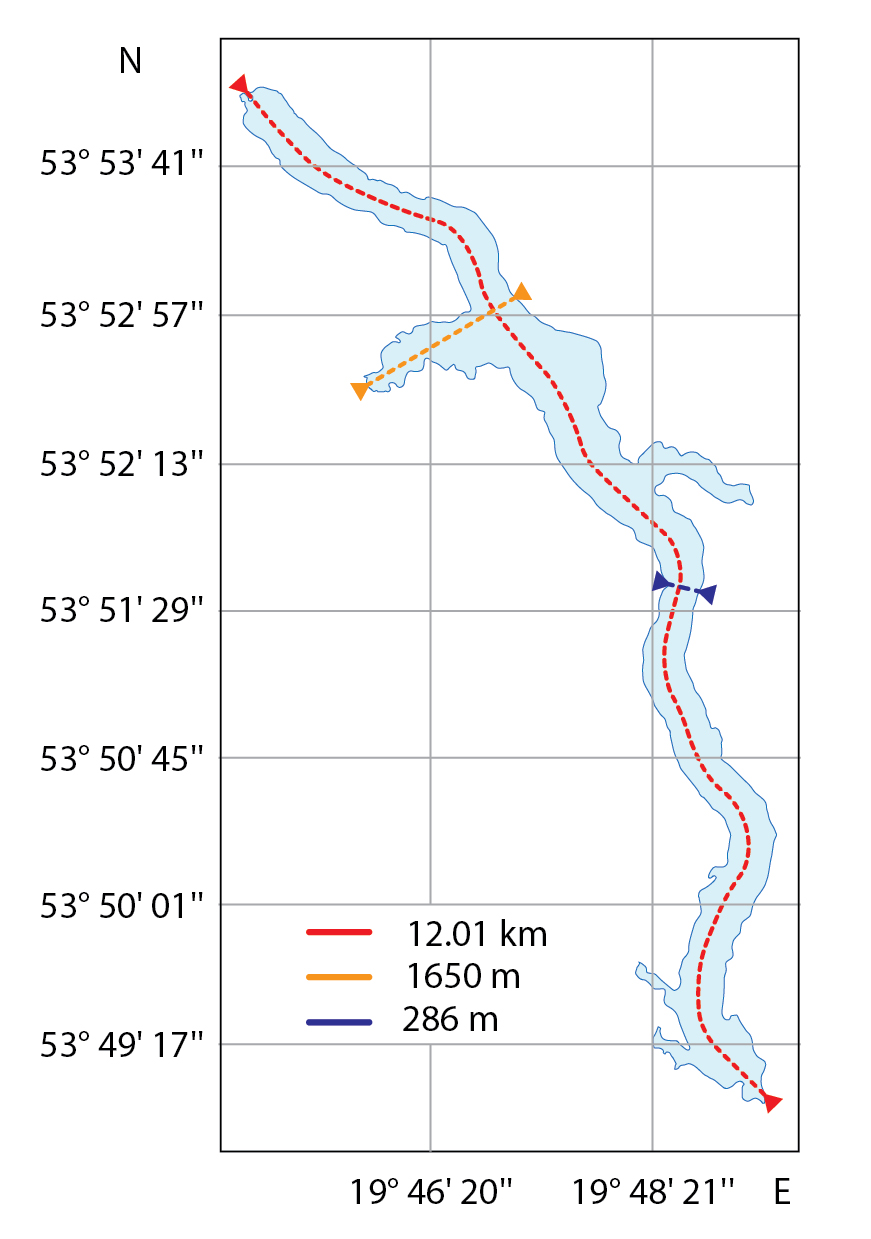
Dimensions of Lake Ruda Woda (Length, Min. and Max. Width)

The long and narrow lake runs in a north-south direction, and its course is characterized by numerous bends. The total length of the lake, measured along the centerline, is 12.01 kilometres (7.46 mi), with an average width of only 497 metres (1,631 ft). At its widest point, the lake measures 1,650 metres (5,410 ft). While historical sources often list the lake's area as 654.1 ha (2.525 sq mi) —a figure that continues to be incorrectly cited— modern government topographic maps show it as 613.4 ha (2.368 sq mi). The coastline is 35.8 kilometres (22.2 mi) long.

Two distinct, noticeably shallower bays can be found to the east and west of the main body of water. The western bay near the village of Sople contains three small islands. On the opposite shore of the western bay, where the former site once served to store and prepare wood for rafting, a scout camp has been established. The camp hosts annual sailing and scouting events. The eastern bay, known as Zatoka Drela (Drela Bay) or Żydowski Kąt (Jewish Corner), is where the lake's main tributary, the Drela River (German: Drehle), flows in. The name Żydowski Kąt (Jewish Corner) originates from wartime stories among the local population, which claim that the Jewish owner of a nearby inn and his family were drowned in the lake. Stretching to the southeast, Drela Bay, together with the lake's main route, forms a peninsula known as Stańkowo. In the southern part of the lake, two small bays extend northwest, where the village of Liksajny is located. The lake features seven uninhabited islands, the largest of which is situated in the northern part, opposite the village of Wilamowo.

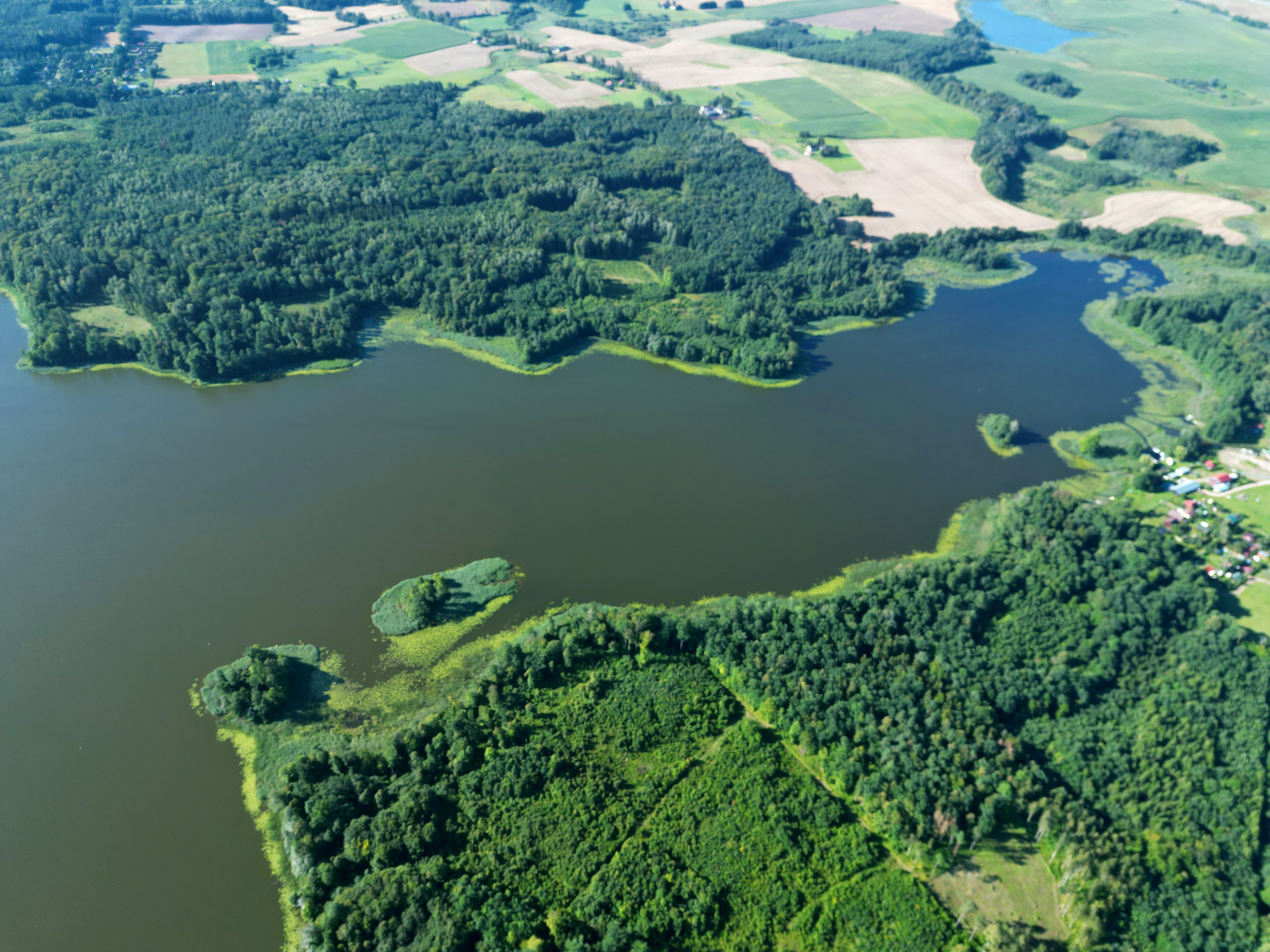
The western bay of Lake Ruda Woda near the village of Sople

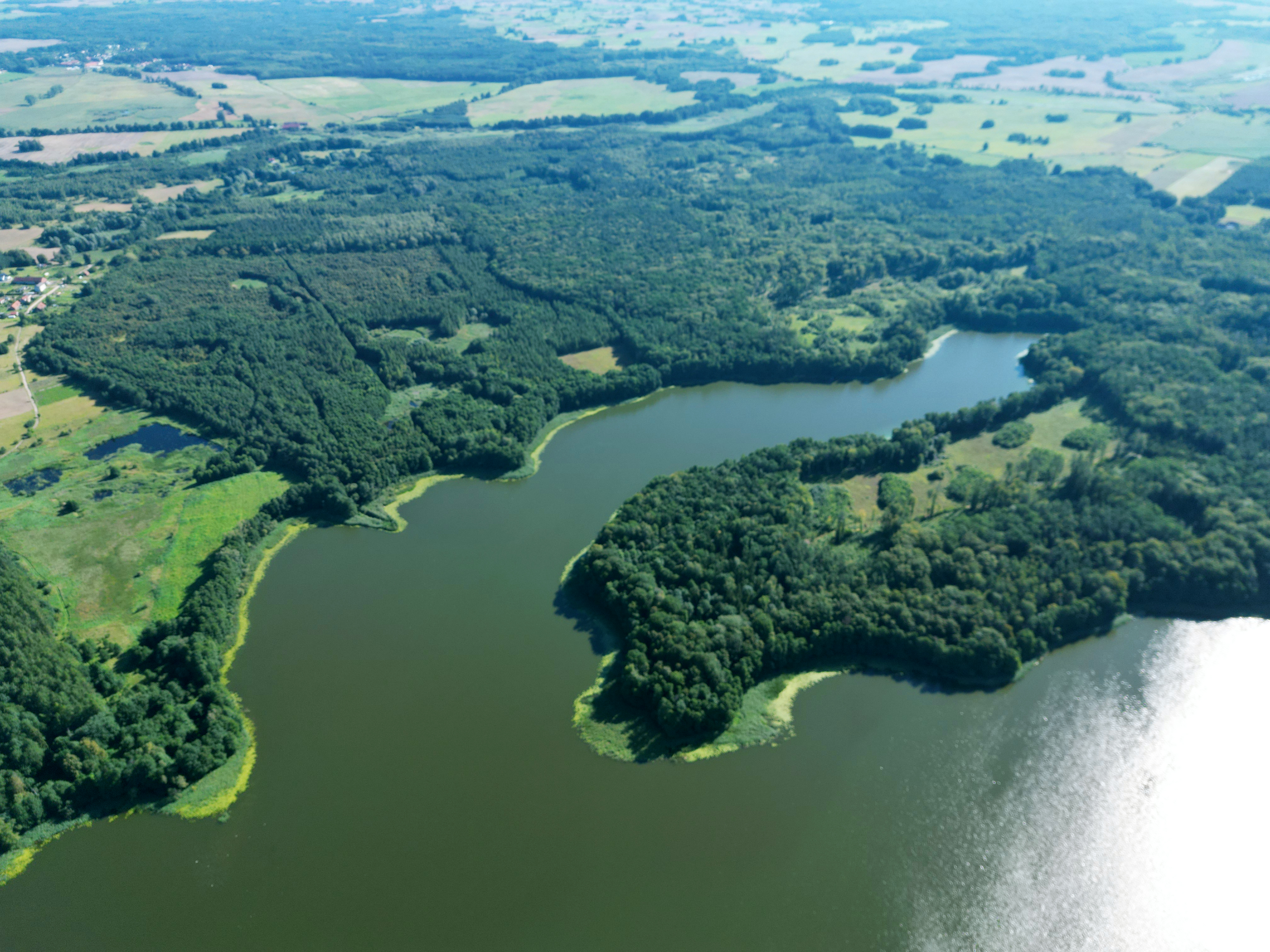
The eastern bay, also known as Zatoka Drela. The Stańkowo Peninsula is on the right

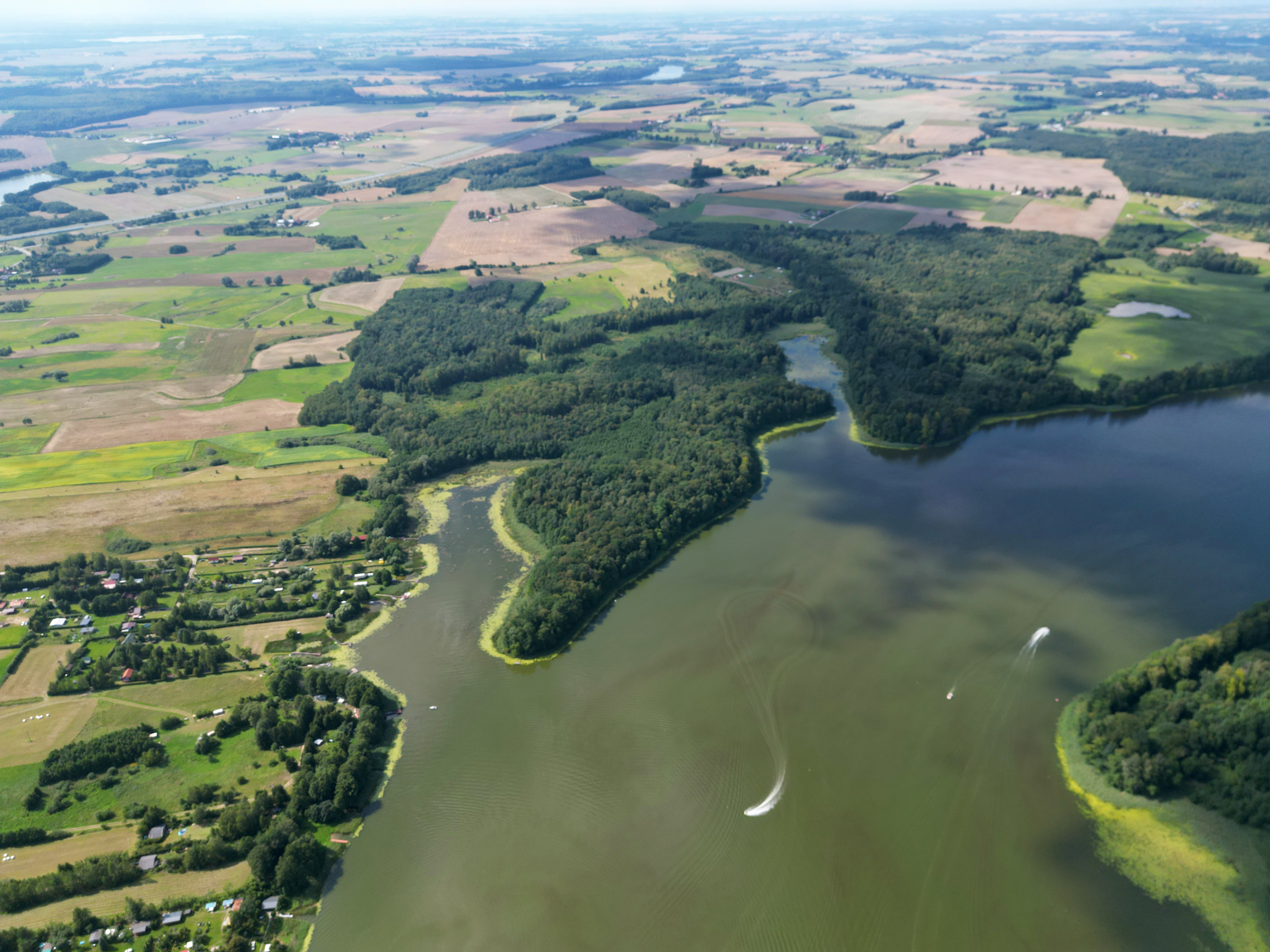
Two shallow bays near the village of Liksajny
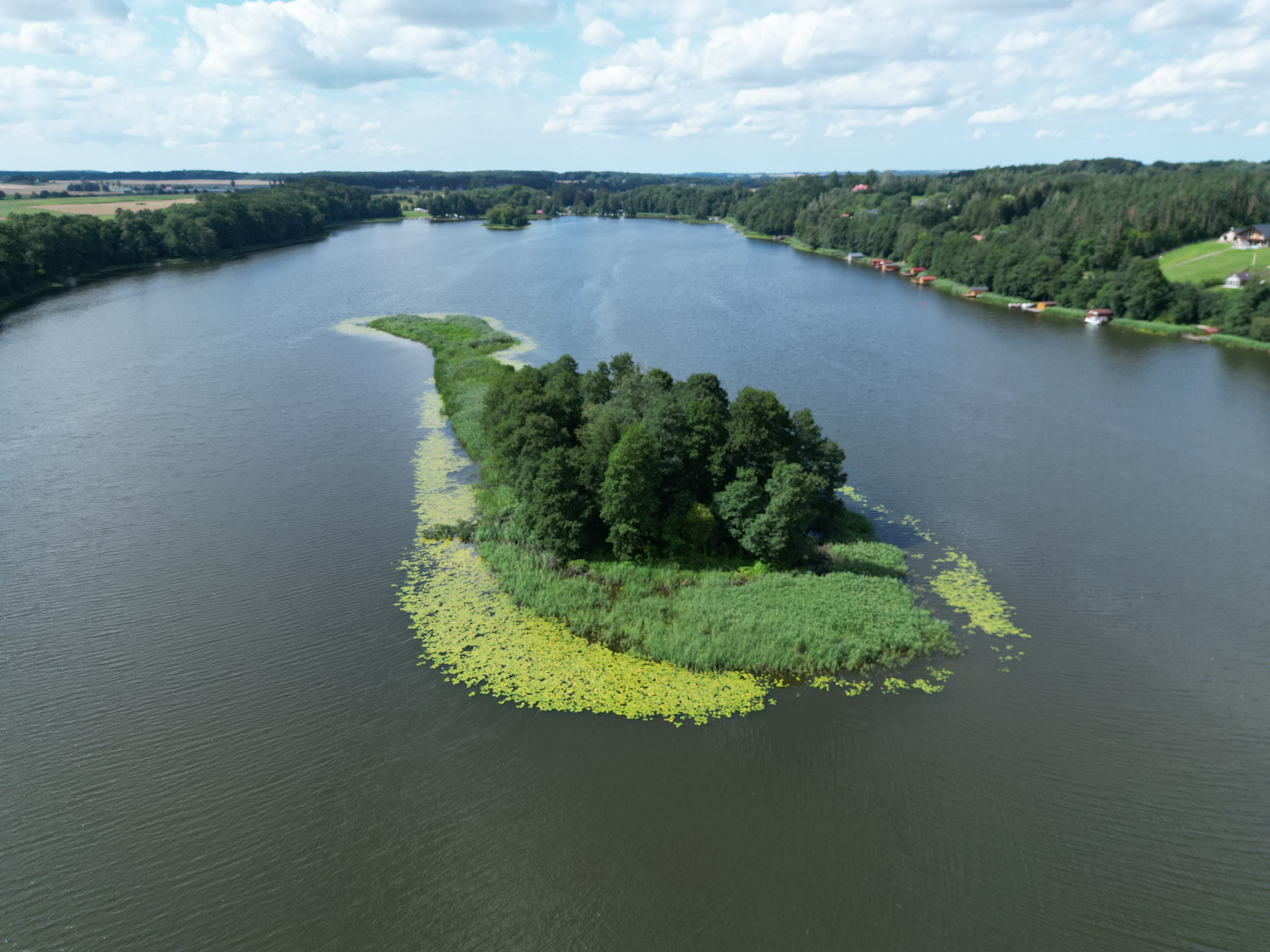
The largest island on the lake, located across from the village of Wilamowo

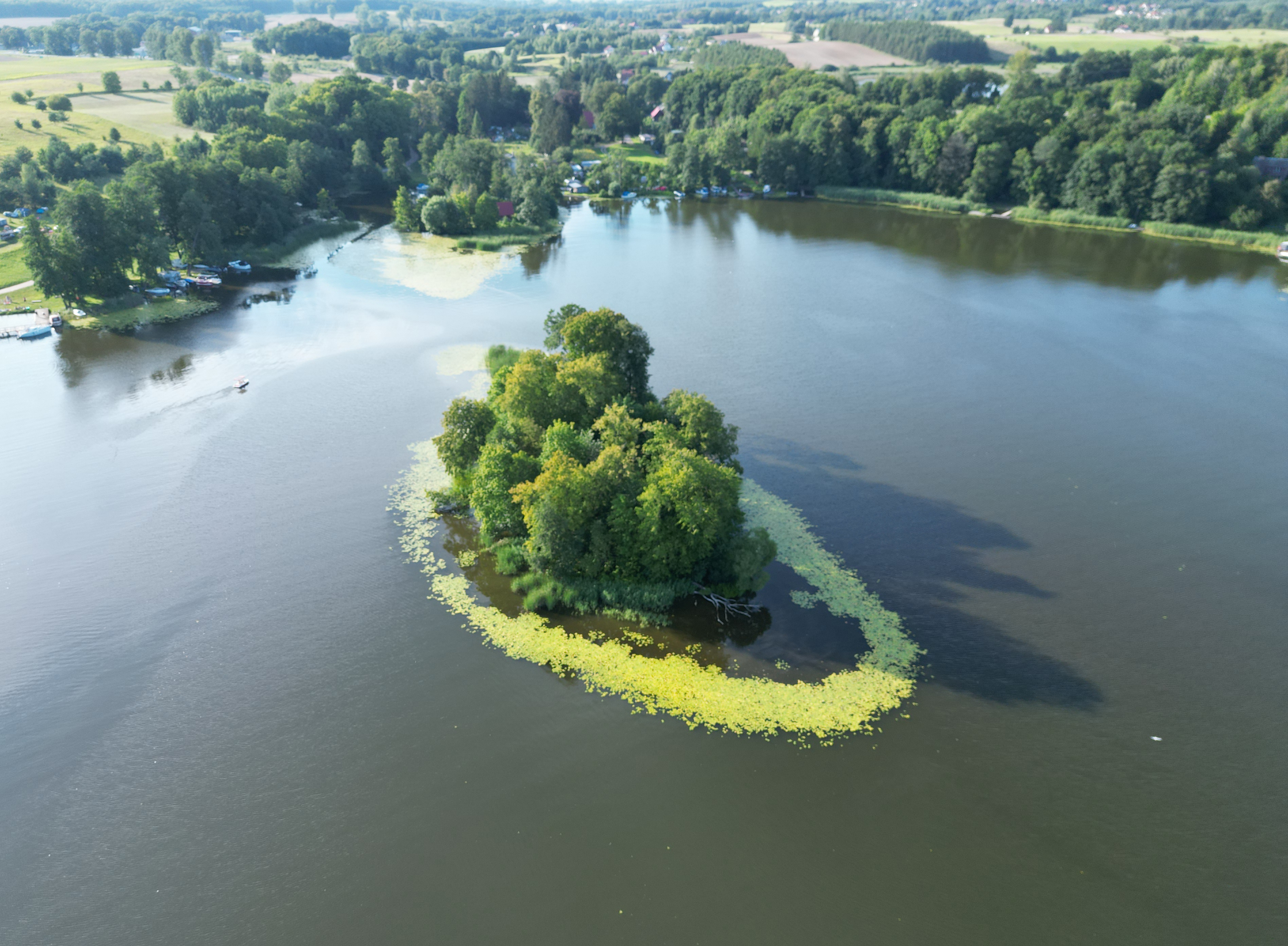
An island situated at the northern end of the lake, near the entrance to the Elbląg Canal

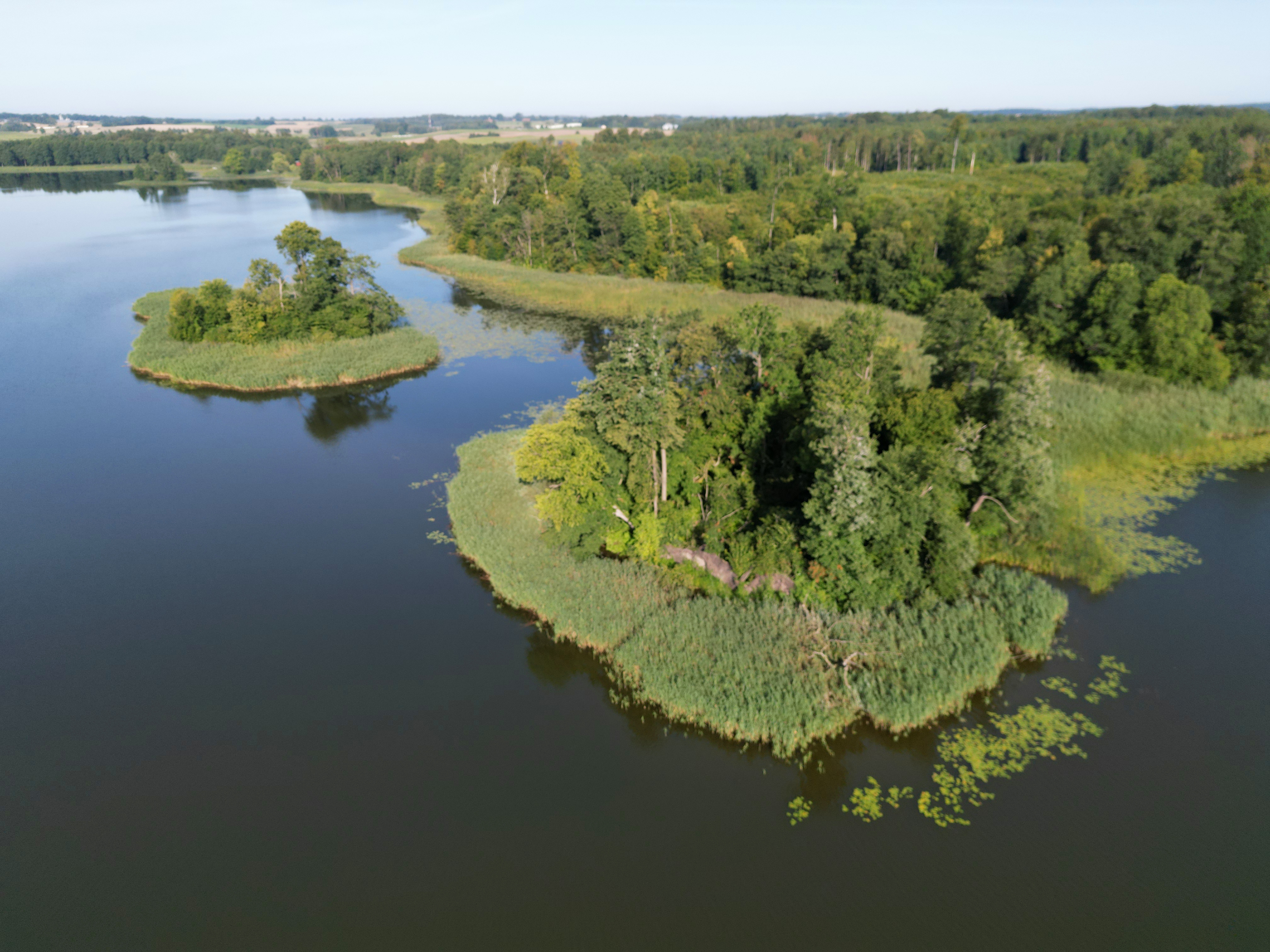
Two unnamed islands in the western bay

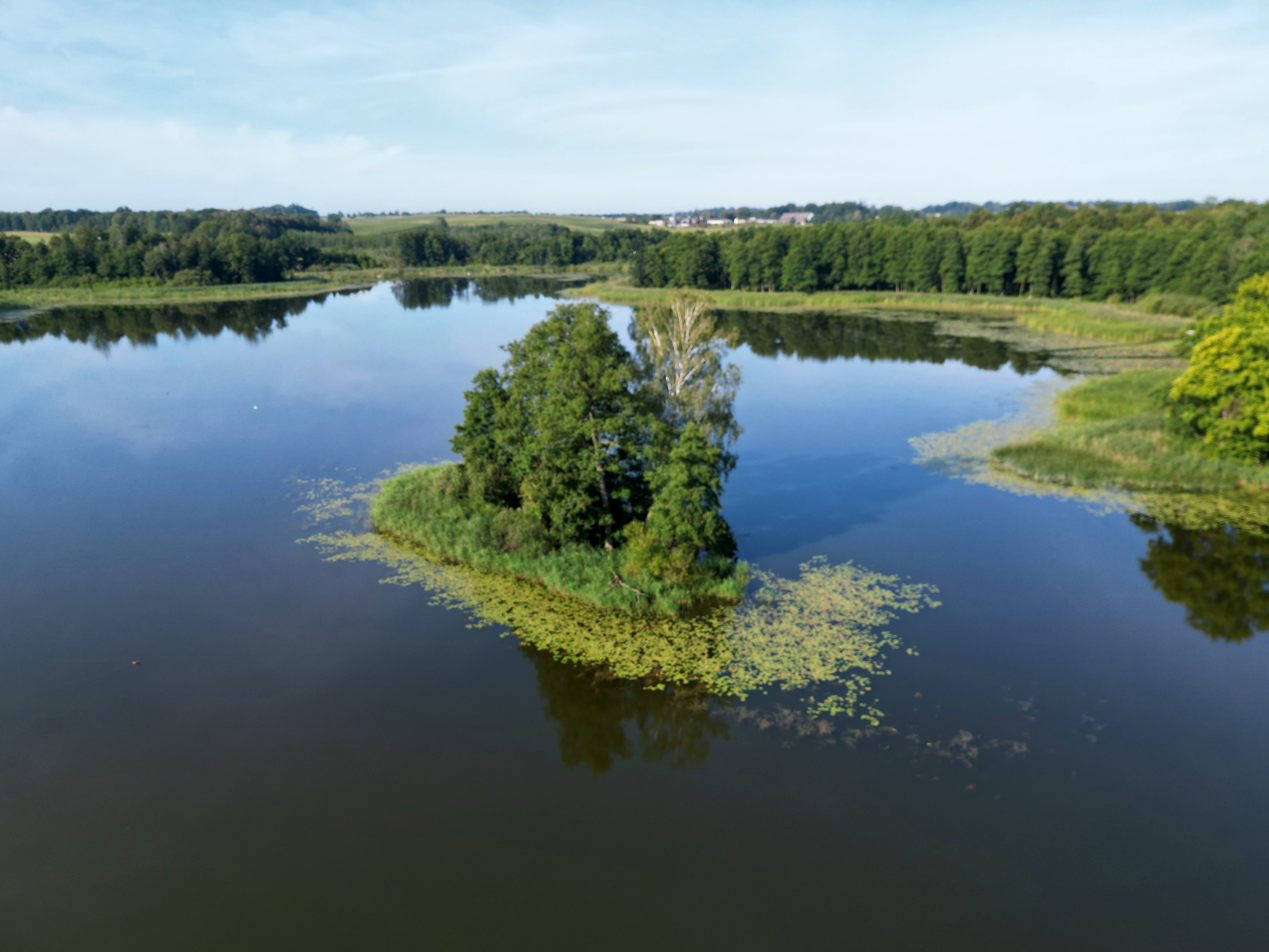
Dąbniaczek (German: Eichwerder, meaning Oak Island) — the only named island on the Lake Ruda Woda

Besides the Drela River, the lake is fed by smaller, unnamed tributaries that dry up seasonally. The largest of these are located near the villages of Wilamowo and Sople. Ruda Woda Lake is connected by the Elbląg Canal to Lake Rakówka (German: Krebs) and then Ilińsk to the south, and to Lake Sambród to the north. At the four-kilometer mark (counting from the southern end) on the eastern shore, there is an entrance to the Ducki Canal, which connects Ruda Woda Lake with Lake Bartężek (German: Bärting See) to the southeast.

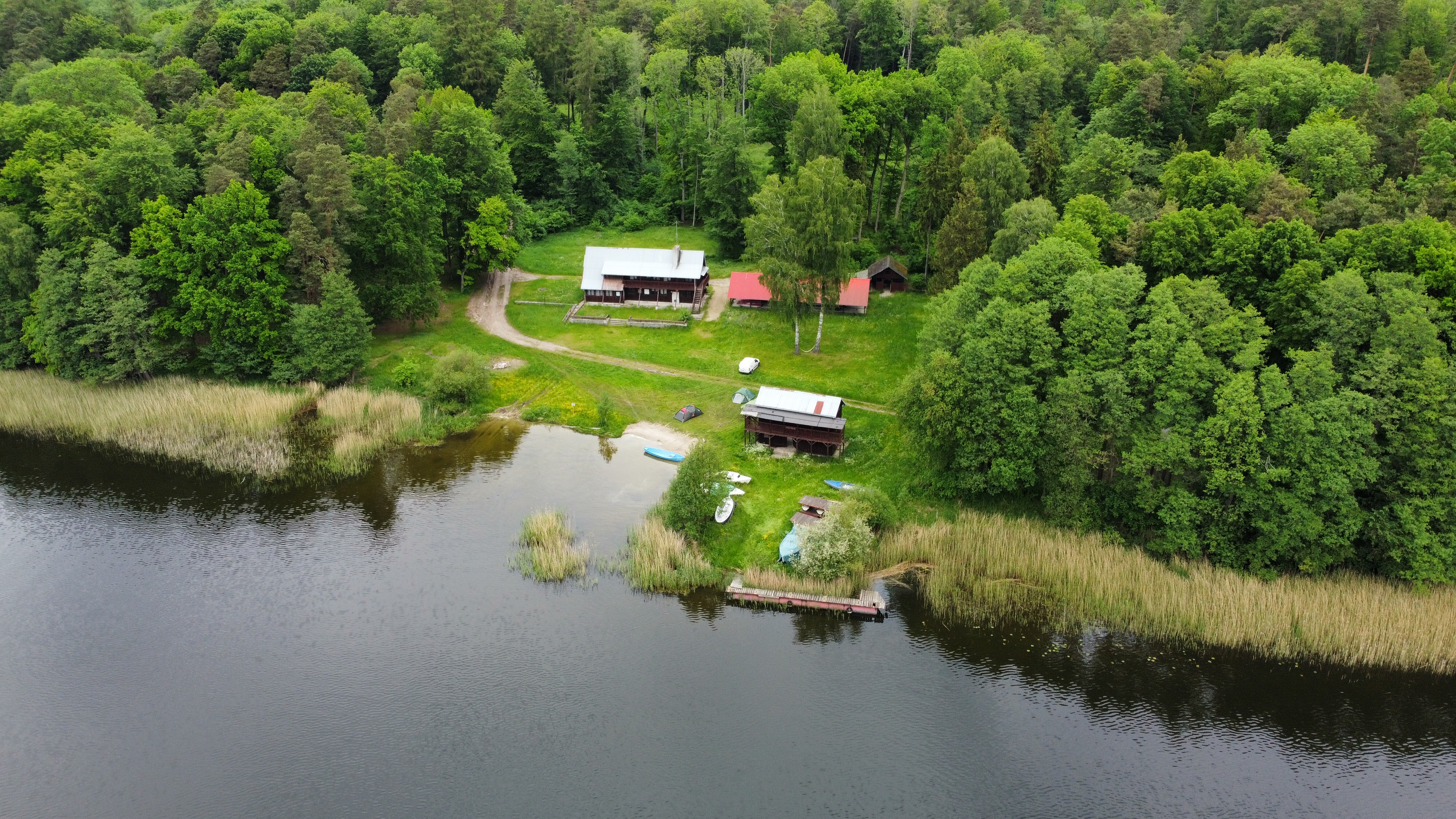
Scout camp at Lake Ruda Woda

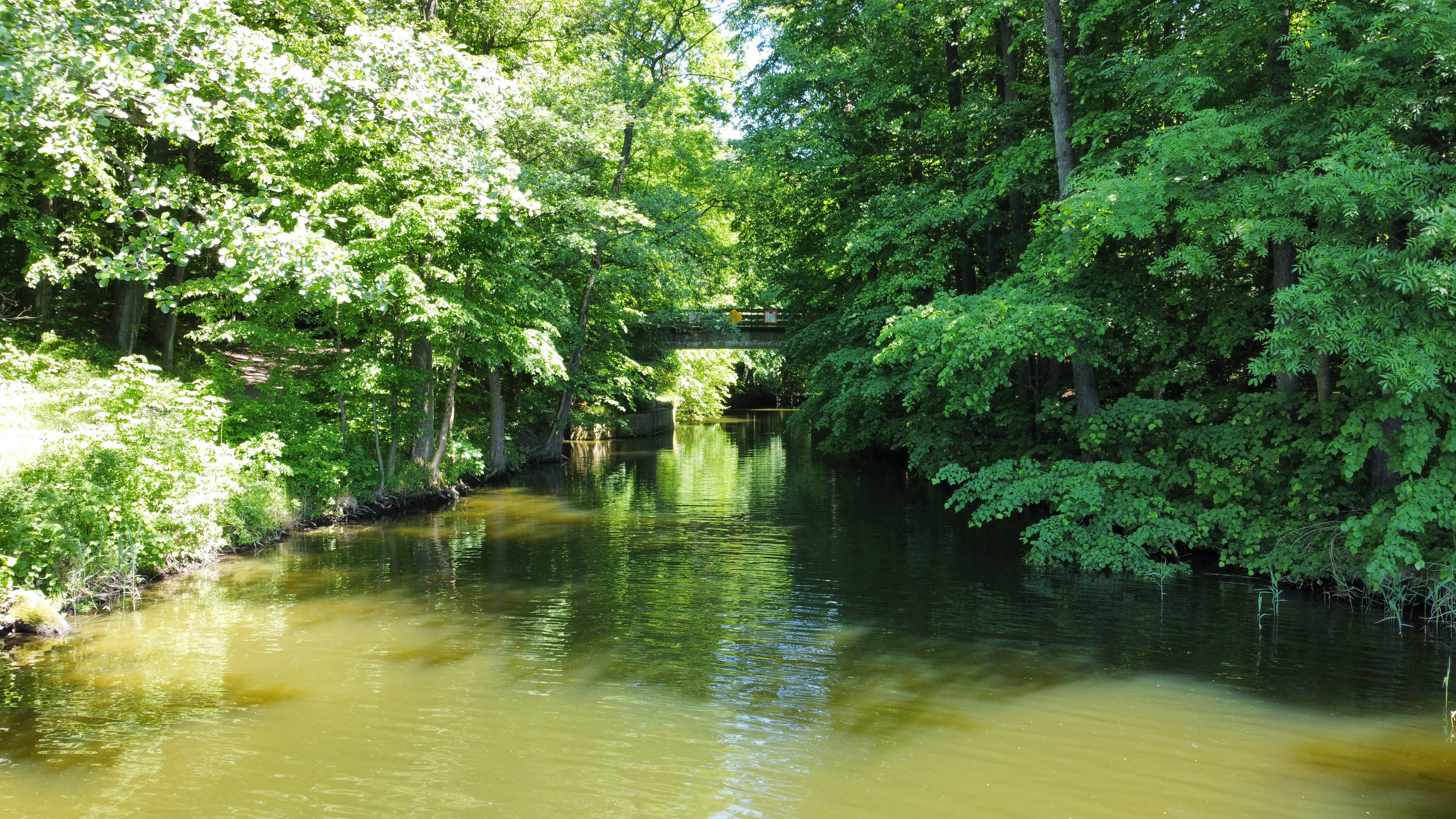
Entrance to Ducki Canal from the lake

=== Bathymetry ===
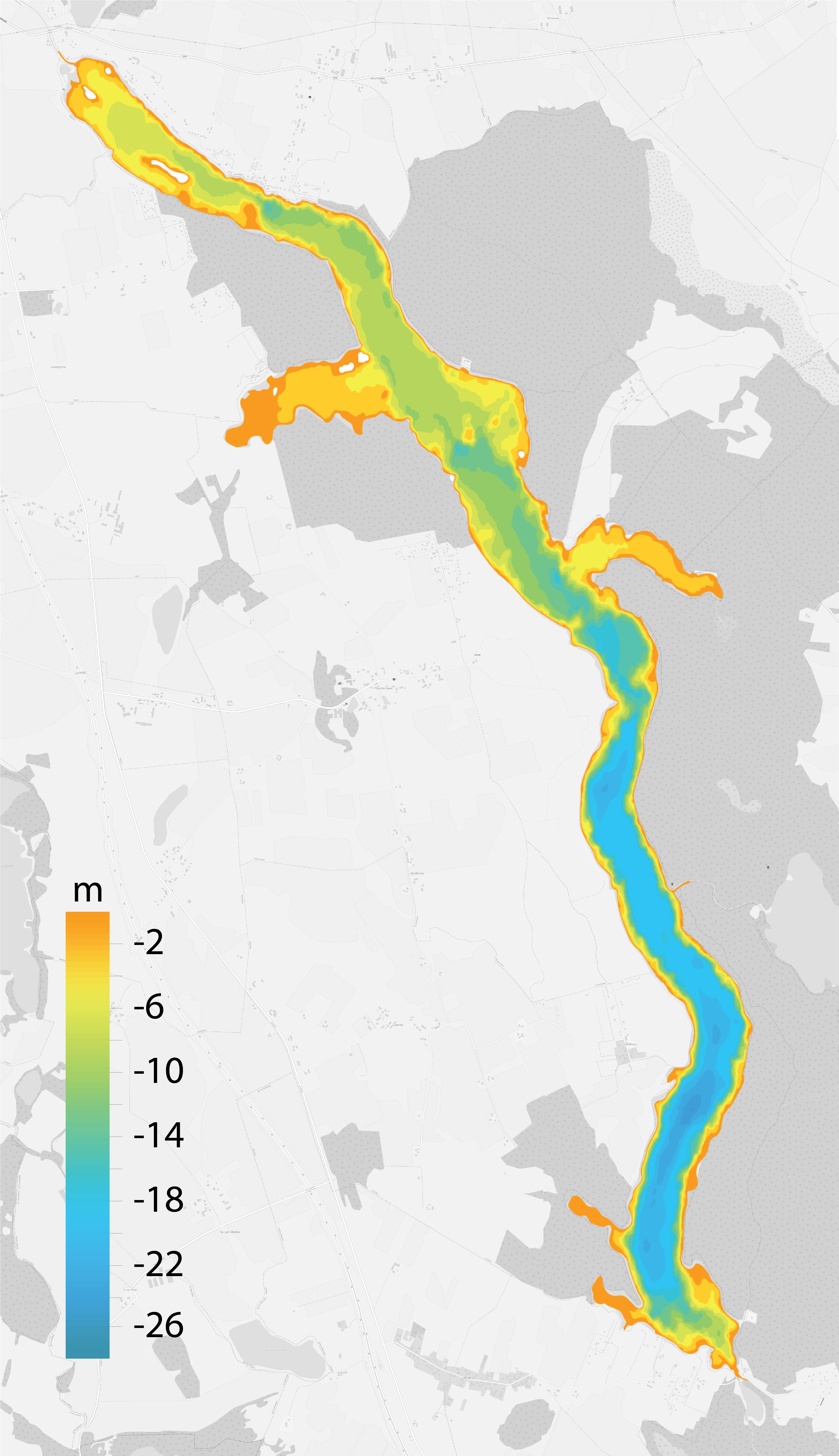
Bathymetric map of Lake Ruda Woda

The floor of Lake Ruda Woda is typical of lakes formed by rivers eroding the substrate under a glacier. The varying pressure from the ice caused the rivers to carve the lakebed in different directions, creating numerous depressions and shallows.

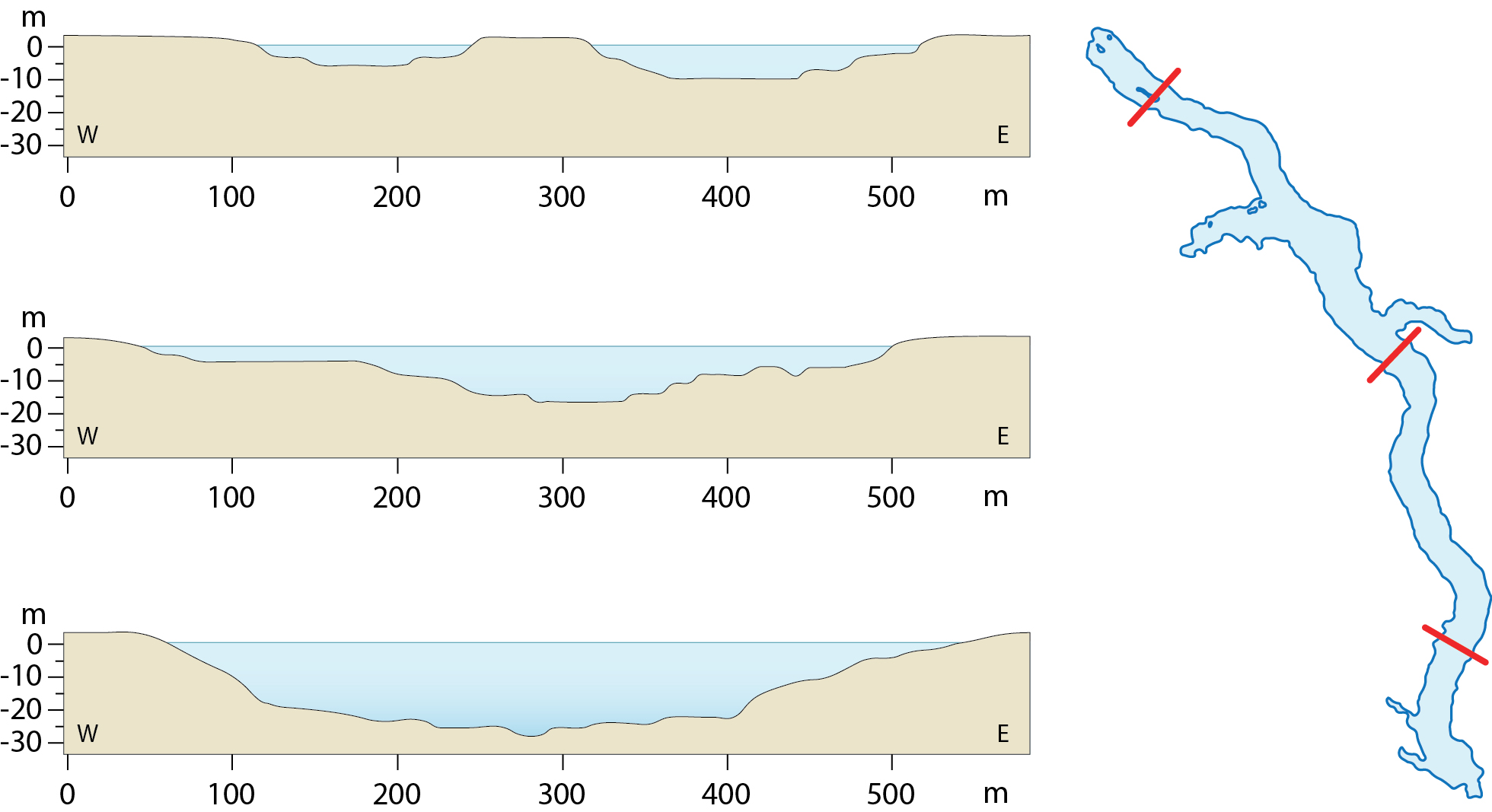
Depth profiles of Lake Ruda Woda. The profiles along the lines marked at various sections of the lake show a gradual increase in depth from north to south.

The lake has an average depth of 10.3 metres (34 ft), however, its depth varies significantly from north to south. In the northern part, the average depth is 6.5 metres (21 ft), increasing to about 9.4 metres (31 ft) in the central area near Drela Bay, and reaching approximately 14.4 metres (47 ft) meters in the southern section. The southern end of the lake becomes much shallower before it flows into the Elbląg Canal

The depth gradient is further highlighted by the fact that all the islands are situated in the shallower northern part of the lake. This region also features a prominent shoal extending toward the lake's center, across from the village of Wilamowo. In contrast, the lake reaches its greatest depth about 2 kilometres (1.2 mi) from the southern end, near the village of Szymonówko, where it drops to more than 27 metres (89 ft) below the surface.

== History and economy ==
=== Settlement history ===
The lake is located in the historic region of Pogezania, inhabited from the 5th to the 9th century by Prussian tribes—Baltic peoples who spoke an Indo-European language of the Baltic branch. Many names of the villages situated around the lake may derive from the Old Prussian language, such as Małdyty, Ględy, Bartężek, and Sople.

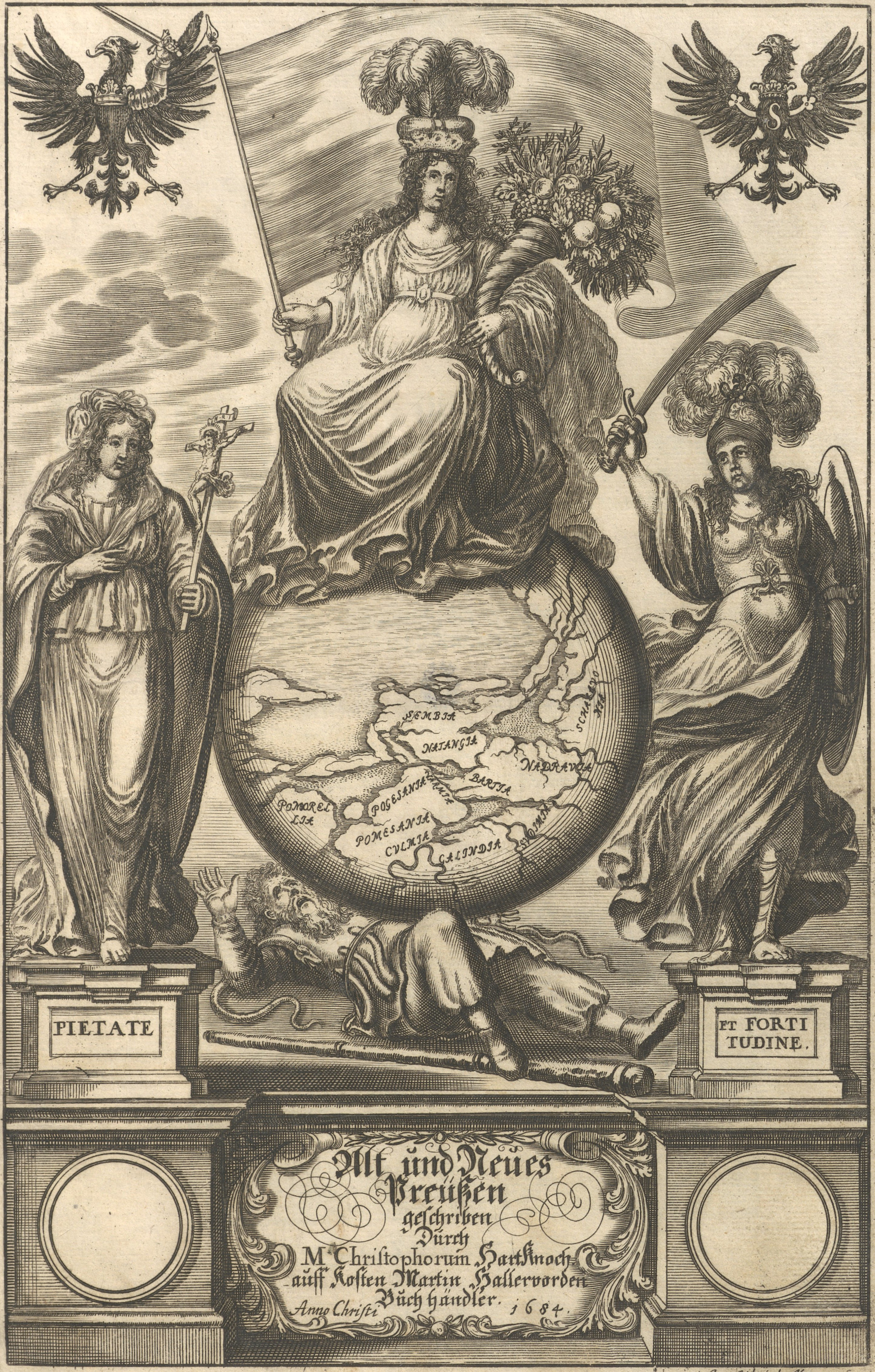
An illustration from 1684 by Christoph Hartknoch depicts the Teutonic triumph in Prussia

These lands became the target of conquest by the Teutonic Order from the 13th century onwards, having been brought to the region by Konrad I of Masovia. Teutonic colonization was part of a broader christianization campaign of the Northern European peoples, aimed at imposing Scandinavian and German rule, known as the Northern Crusades.

The Teutonic Order brought settlers from German-speaking countries to these areas. During this time, the villages of Wilamowo (1308), Szymonowo (1324), Liksajny (1325), Wenecja (1336), Bartężek (1340) and Czulpa (1345) were founded. The pace of German colonization slowed with the crisis and decline of the Teutonic state. After the Second Peace of Thorn in 1466, there was an increasing influx of Polish settlers, peaking in the 17th and 18th centuries.

The population growth accelerated in the 19th century, supported by the region's economic development, exemplified by the construction of the Oberland Canal, with Lake Ruda Woda becoming its longest natural section.

After World War II, the province of East Prussia ceased to exist, and the areas where the lake is located were incorporated into Poland. Due to expulsions and relocations, these areas became predominantly Polish.

=== Construction of the Oberland Canal ===
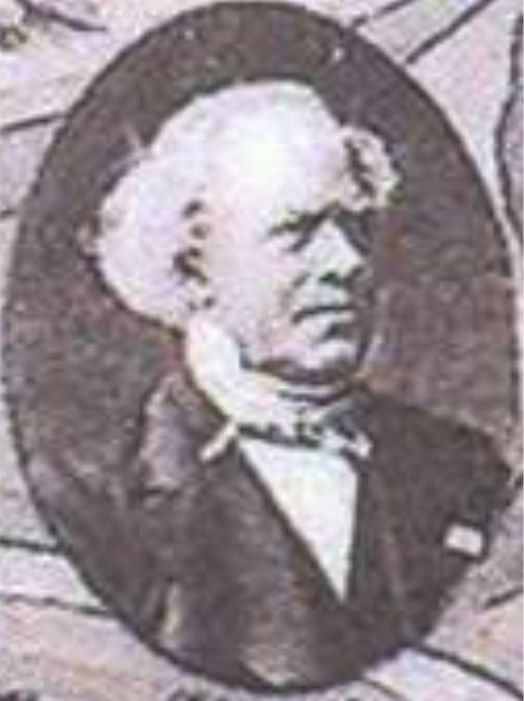
Georg Jacob Steenke - constructor of the canal

In 1844, the construction of the Oberland Canal began, aiming to connect the lakes of Oberland (Lake Jeziorak and Lake Drwęca) with Lake Drużno near Elbląg, and ultimately with the Vistula River and the Baltic Sea. The canal was designed to stimulate the economic development of towns and villages in East Prussia, which, during the Industrial Revolution, required both raw materials for emerging industries and a way to market their natural resources, mainly grain and timber. The canal was constructed by the engineer Georg Jakob Steenke, who resided in Czulpa on Lake Ruda Woda.

The construction of the canal was a massive hydrotechnical undertaking, fundamentally impacting lake's morphometry, which was the longest natural section of the emerging waterway. The difference in elevation between the water level of Lake Drużno, where the route begins, and Lake Jeziorak, where it ends, was 99.4 metres (326 ft). The water levels of the lakes along the canal's route were equalized to meet of those of Lake Jeziorak (99.4 metres (326 ft)). Before the lowering, Lake Ruda Woda’s surface was at an elevation of 101.3 metres (332 ft). As a result of the canal's construction, its water level dropped by over 1.7 metres (5 ft 7 in). Consequently, its original area became almost 8.5% smaller. The excess water from the lowered lake was drained into Lake Drwęckie, and then through the Drwęca River to the Vistula River and the Baltic Sea. Bernhard Ohlert's account of his multi-day expedition along the Oberland Canal in 1862 describes the consequences of the lowered water level in Lake Ruda Woda. Ohlert noted:

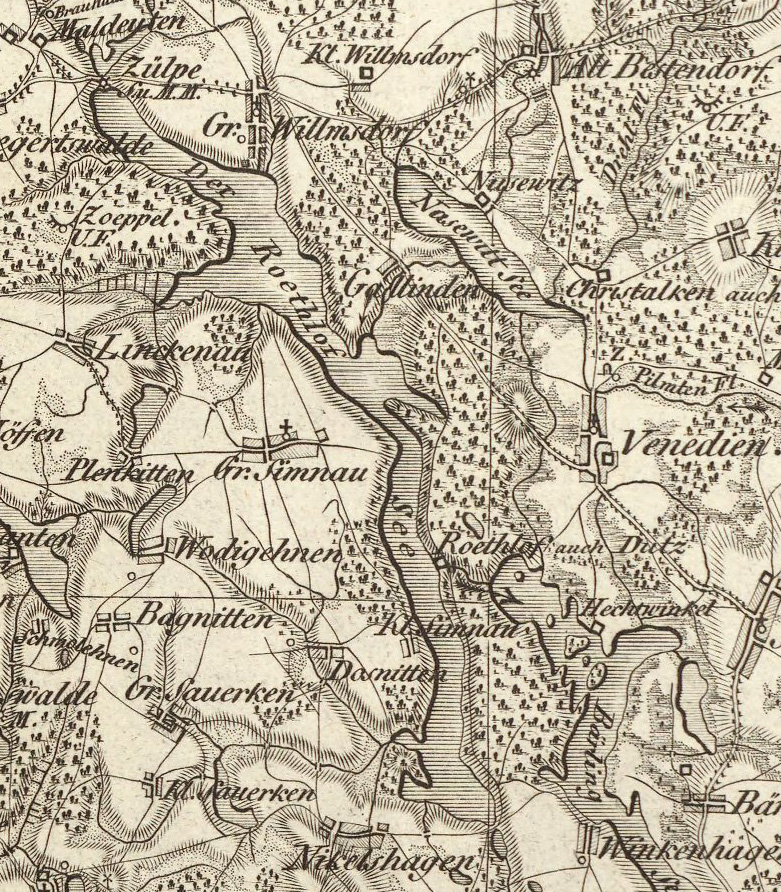
Lake Ruda Woda on the 1802 map by Friedrich Leopold von Schrötter. To the east, the now non-existent Lake Naświty

The opposite shore [of lake Ruda Woda] presents a peculiar appearance. In front of the forest crown covered with tall, old trees, there is a much lower, differently colored strip of young growth, which obviously emerged only after the partial draining of the lake basin. Curiously, it consists almost exclusively of alders, whereas in the high forest behind it, the alder is only sporadically present.

The hydrological work related to the canal's construction also led to the drying up of Lake Naświty (German: Nasewittsee), which was connected to Lake Ruda Woda and located northeast of it. This occurred despite Steenke's plan to use Lake Naświty to connect Lake Ruda Woda with Lake Morąg, and ultimately with Morąg.

=== Transportation ===
==== before the 20th century ====
Lake Ruda Woda, due to its elongated shape, has been a convenient route for transporting goods since medieval times. However, the lake was situated outside the Teutonic main waterway network of that era (from Ostróda via the Drwęca River to Toruń, and then along the Vistula to Gdańsk), and thus had only local significance. The construction of the Elbląg Canal substantially shortened the previous water route from Ostróda and Iława to the Baltic Sea, making Lake Ruda Woda an important link in the new transportation route.

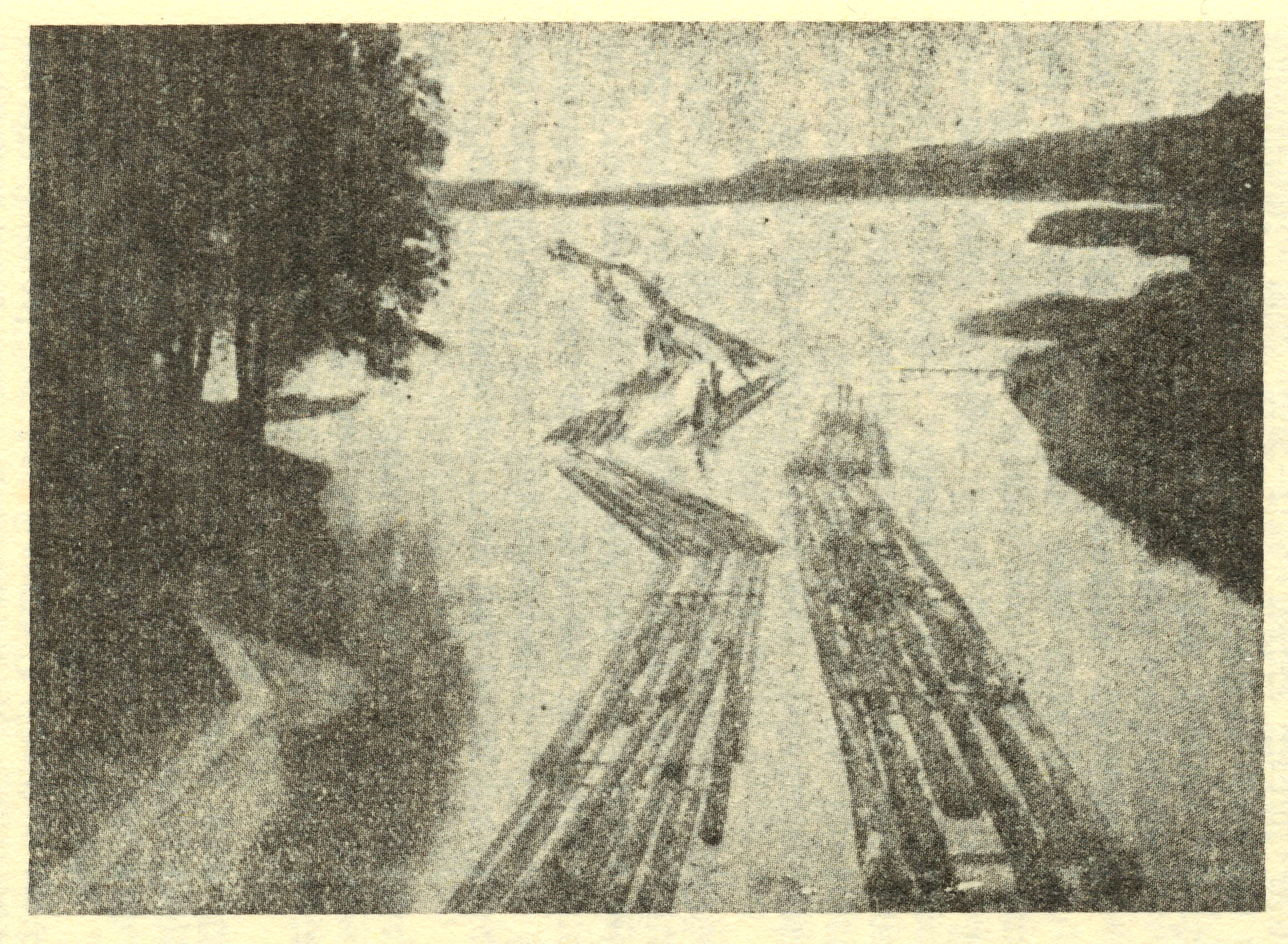
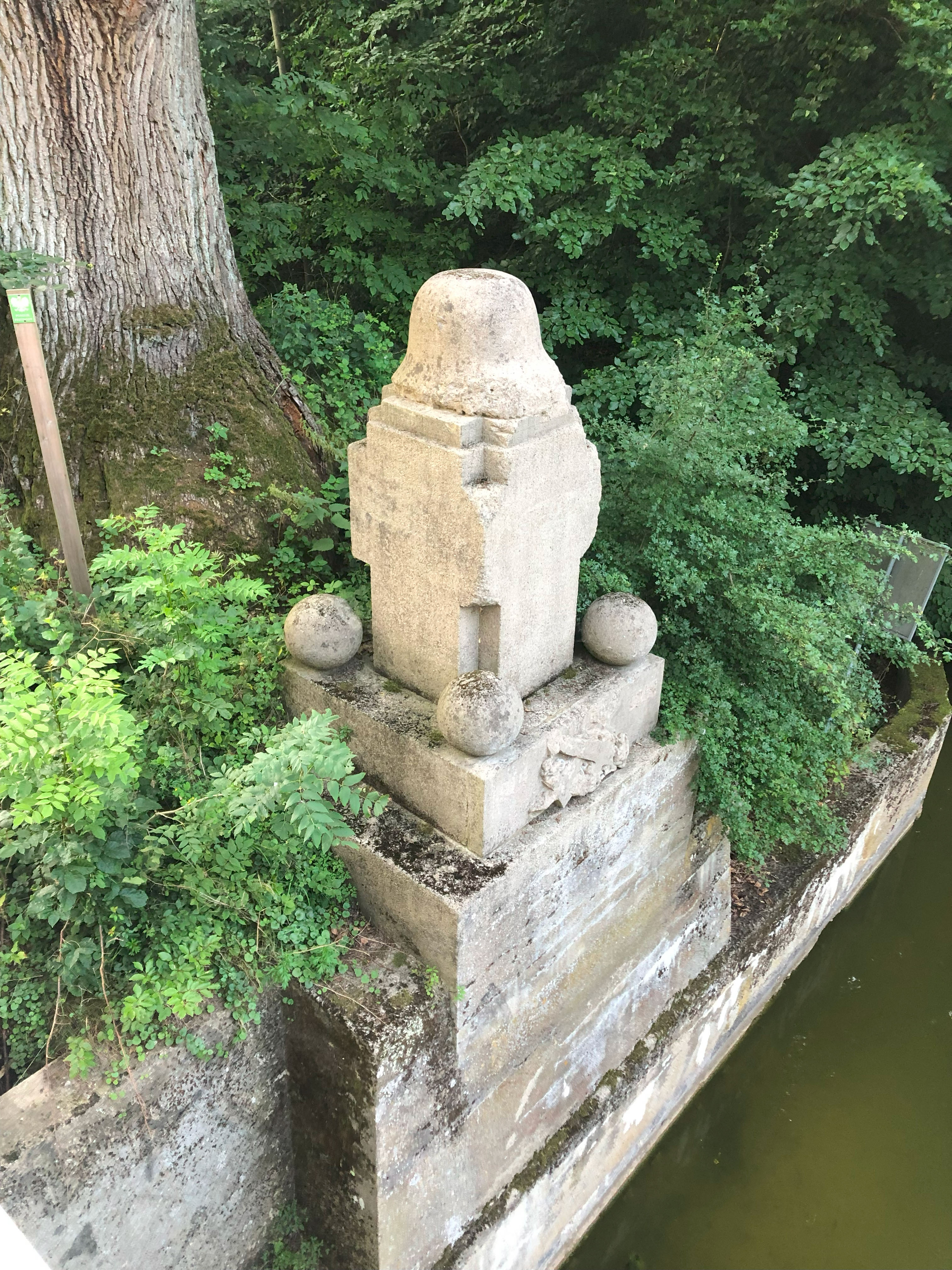
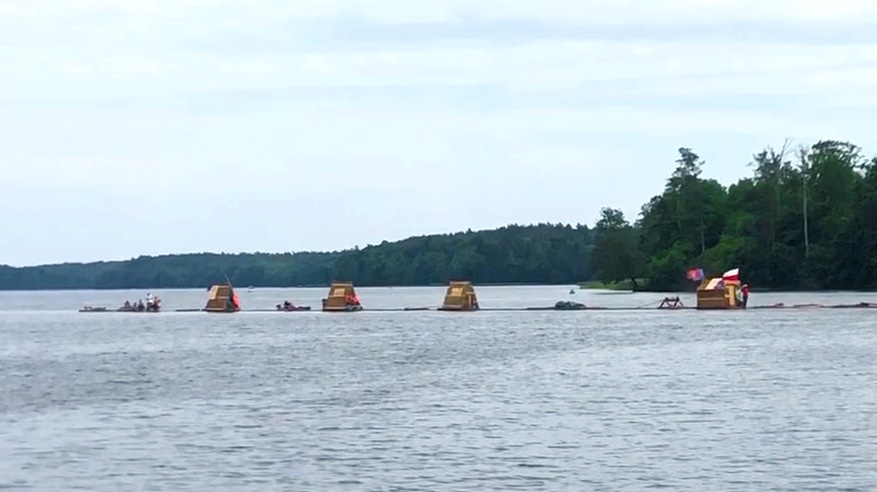
Clockwise: Timber rafting on Lake Ruda Woda, circa 1920, source: Bildarchiv Ostpreußen, www.bildarchiv-ostpreussen.de; A monument located by the lake, honoring Prussian raftsmen who died in World War I; Reenactment of the historic timber rafting, June 2022

The opening of the canal led to the development of timber rafting. The primary cargo transported across the lake this way was pines from the forests around Ostróda and Iława. The wood was floated using rafts, which were tree logs layered and bound together. Each raft contained 12 to 15 logs, and its dimensions were strictly regulated by the Canal Police Regulations of April 11, 1861. It was prohibited to float timber at night or to transport unbound logs. The rafts were propelled with long pike pols and towed with ropes along towpaths. The driving force was provided by both humans and horses. The towpath ran along the eastern shore of Lake Ruda Woda.

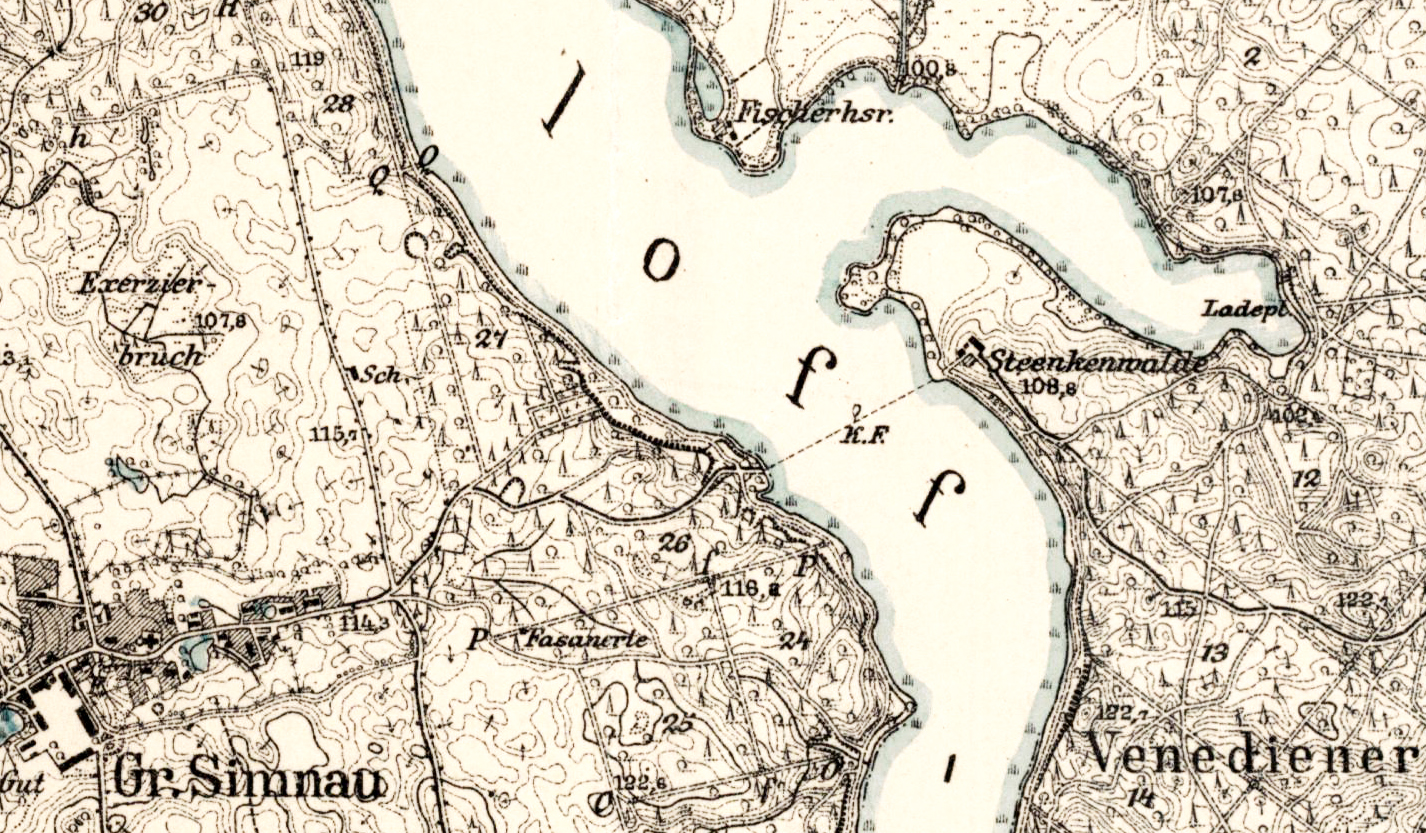
Section of the Lake Ruda Woda 1910 map, showing the settlement of Steenkenwalde and the route of the ferry (KP - German: Kahnfähre, meaning boat ferry)

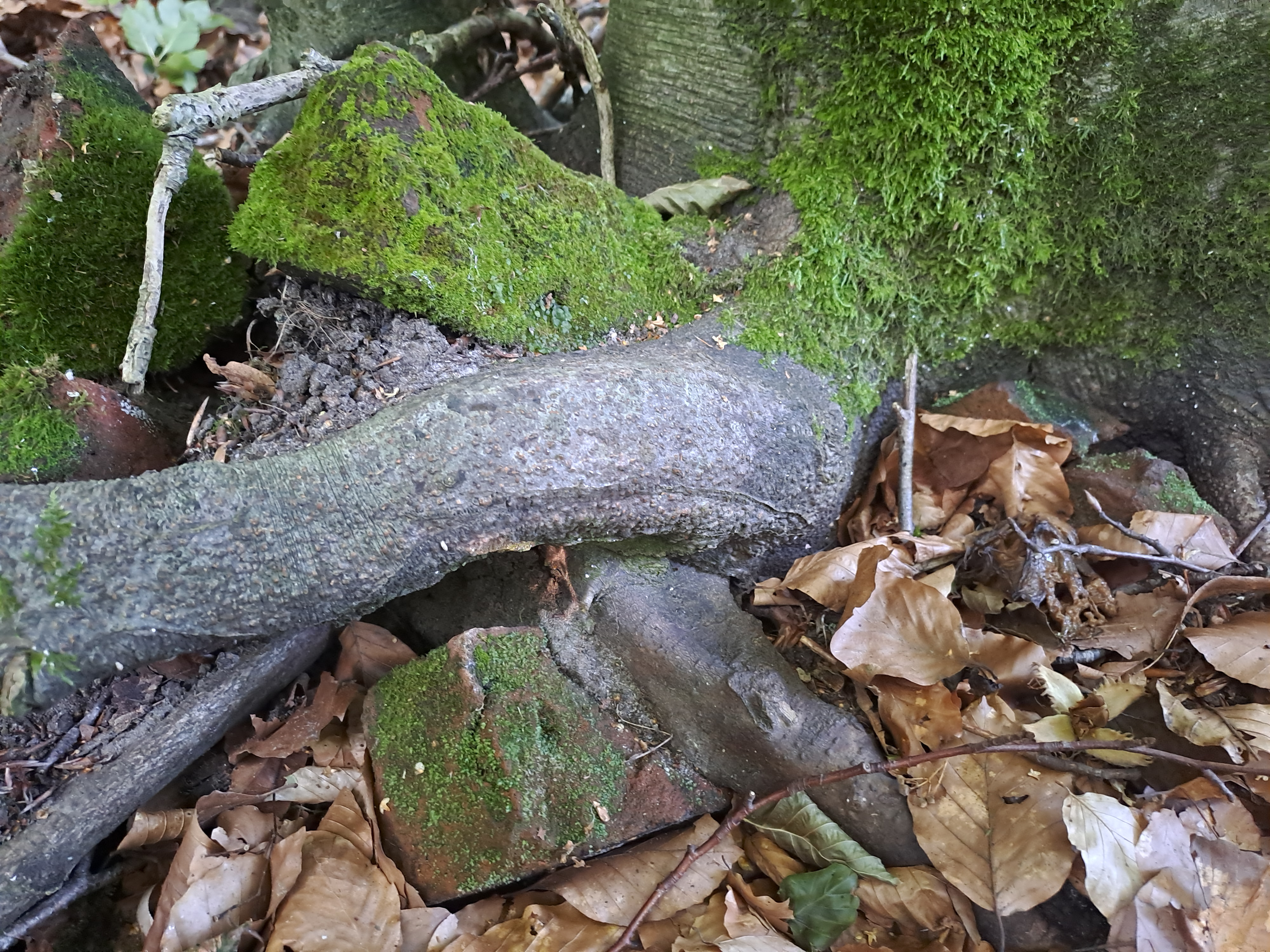
Remains of Steenkenwalde on Stańkowo Peninsula

On the Stańkowo Peninsula, near the mouth of the Drela Bay, the rafting settlement of Steenkenwalde was established, named in honor of the canal's builder, Georg Jakob Steenke. This was a place where barge crews and rafters towing rafts could stop and rest. A ferry operated near the settlement, offering a crucial transportation link across the lake to the village of Szymonowo. The settlement declined in the early 20th century, but its remnants can still be found today.

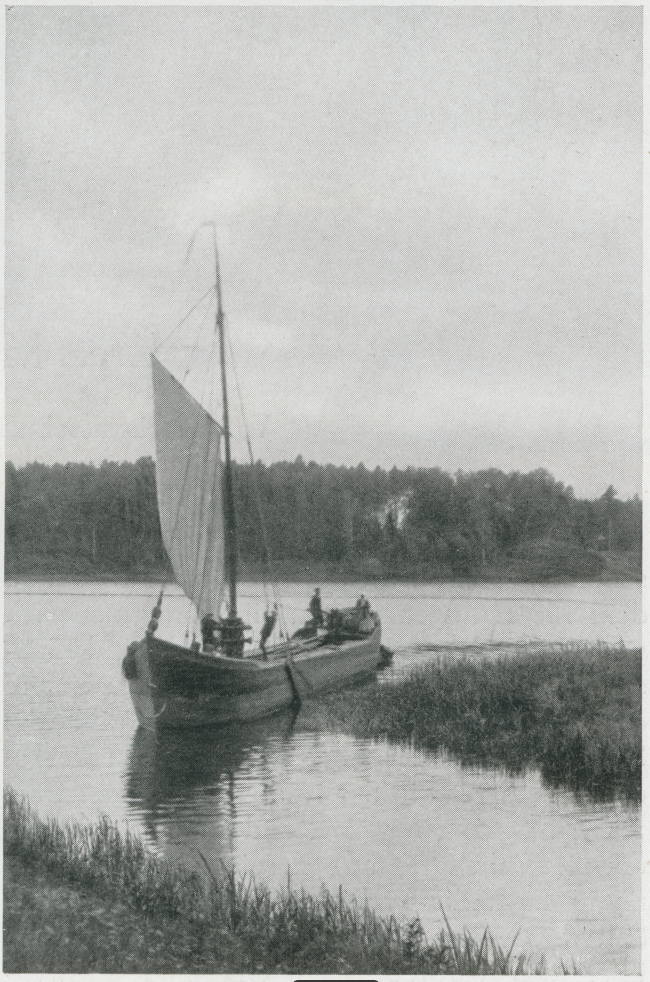
Oberland barge on Lake Ruda Woda at the entrance to the Ducki Canal, 1920s, source: Bildarchiv Ostpreußen, www.bildarchiv-ostpreussen.de

Another popular method of transporting goods across the lake was the Oberland barge also known as the Oberland sailing barge (German: Oberländer Segelkahn) or Oberland cargo barge (German: Oberländer Lastkahn). These barges were smaller than the vessels typically operating in Prussia at the time, due to the dimensions of the canal itself. The barges were wooden sailing vessels with one or two masts.

In 1862, a total of 108 different ships traversed the lake, including five steamships, with a sixth added in 1863. To meet growing demand, 49 new ships were built in 1862, mostly in small canal towns across the land. Upstream (towards Ostróda), there were 1,312 ship transits through the lake, of which 446 were loaded. Downstream (towards Elbląg), 1,901 ship transits were observed, including 1,318 transits of loaded ships and 2,646 passes of rafts of wood. In terms of weight, upstream traffic amounted to 144,650 quintals (7,232,500 kg), while downstream traffic totaled 1,617,249 quintals (80,862,450 kg).

Over time, technological advancements led to the increasing dominance of steam-powered and later diesel-powered vessels in the cargo fleet. Meanwhile, the rapid development of the railway, which took over much of the freight transport, shifted the lake's water traffic to focus primarily on tourism.

==== 1900-1965 ====
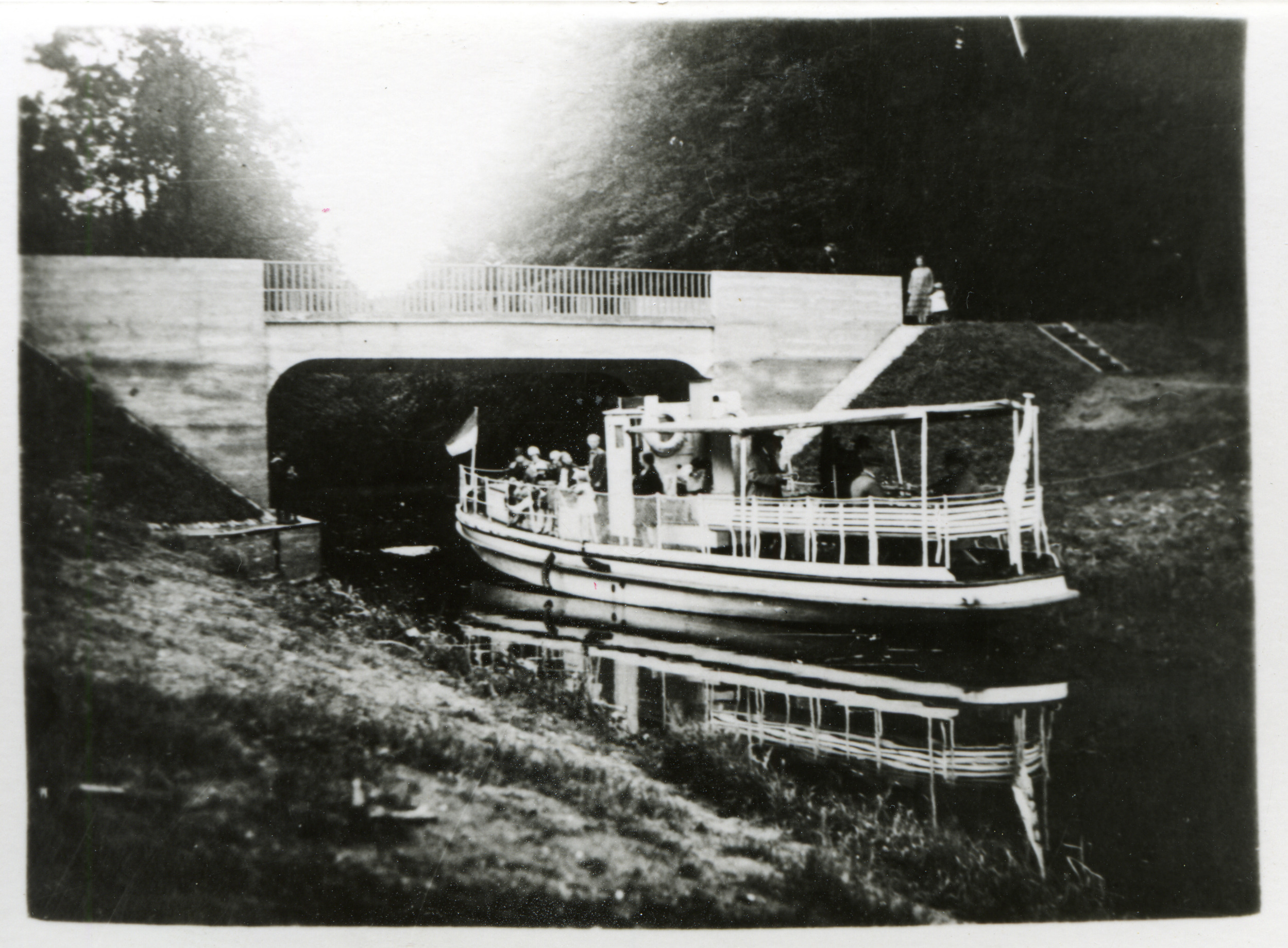
The motorboat Heini, later renamed Biedronka, entering the Ducki Canal from Lake Ruda Woda, 1920s, source: Bildarchiv Ostpreußen, www.bildarchiv-ostpreussen.de

In the second decade of the 20th century, Ostróda shipowner Adolf Tetzlaff began to develop tourist boat services along the canal. His passenger fleet, which included vessels operating on Lake Ruda Woda, consisted of ships such as Seerose (Water Lily), Hertha, Heini, and Konrad. In the 1930s, Tetzlaff's company transported a total of 8,000 to 10,000 passengers. In 1947, the company was nationalized and became the property of the Polish state.

After nationalization, the ships continued to operate under new names. On October 16, 1964, now tugboat Heini, which had been renamed Biedronka (Ladybug), set out from Ostróda to Czulpa, at the northern end of Lake Ruda Woda. On its return journey, Biedronka was to tow a barge loaded with relocation property and a large amount of firewood. Due to overloading, the barge and the tugboat sank near the village of Szymonówko. Of the four people on board, three managed to survive. The captain, Stanisław Podolski, perished. The wrecks of both vessels were eventually salvaged.

==== 1965-present ====
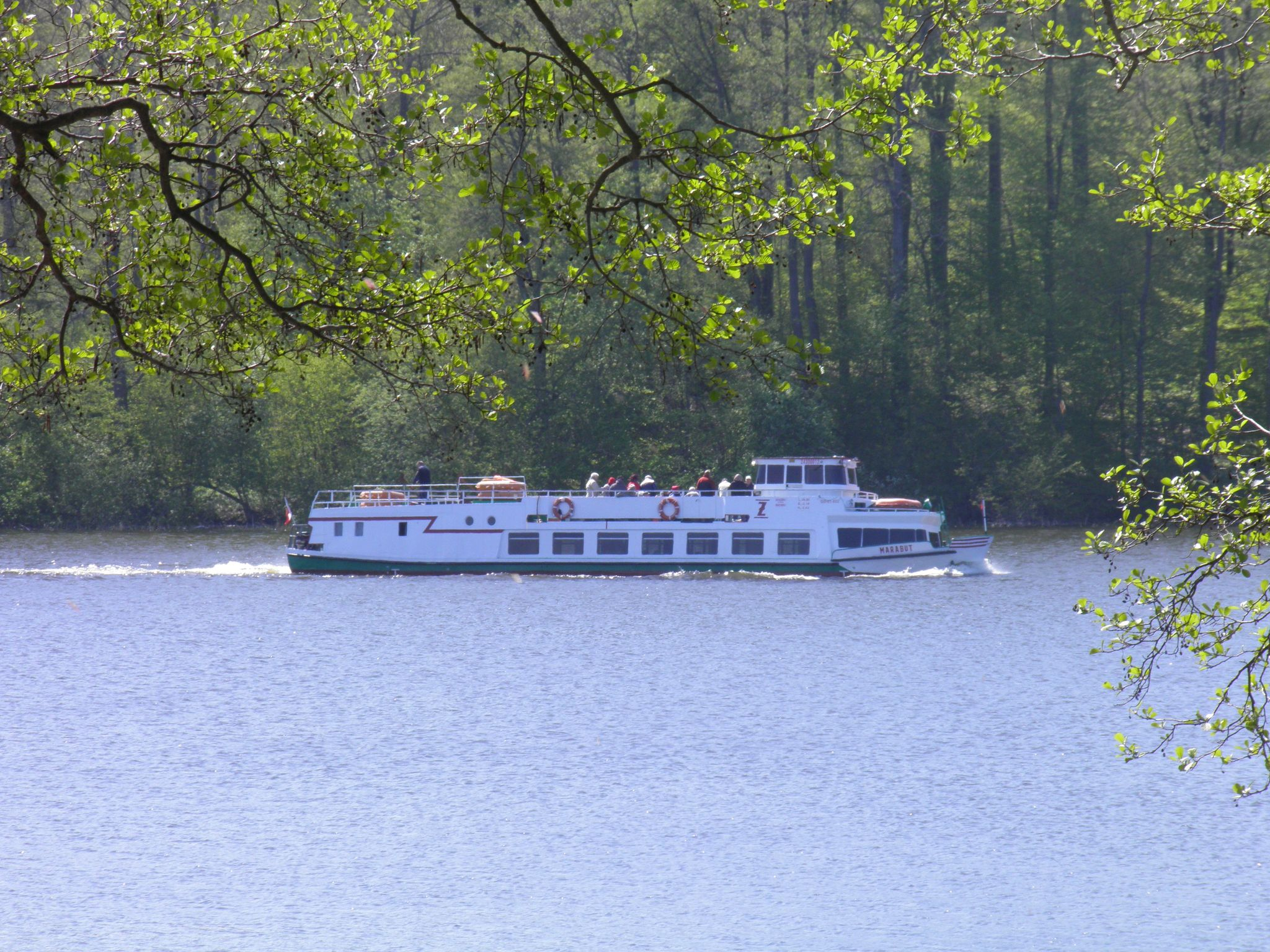
SPJK-type ship "Marabut" during a cruise on Lake Ruda Woda, May 2011

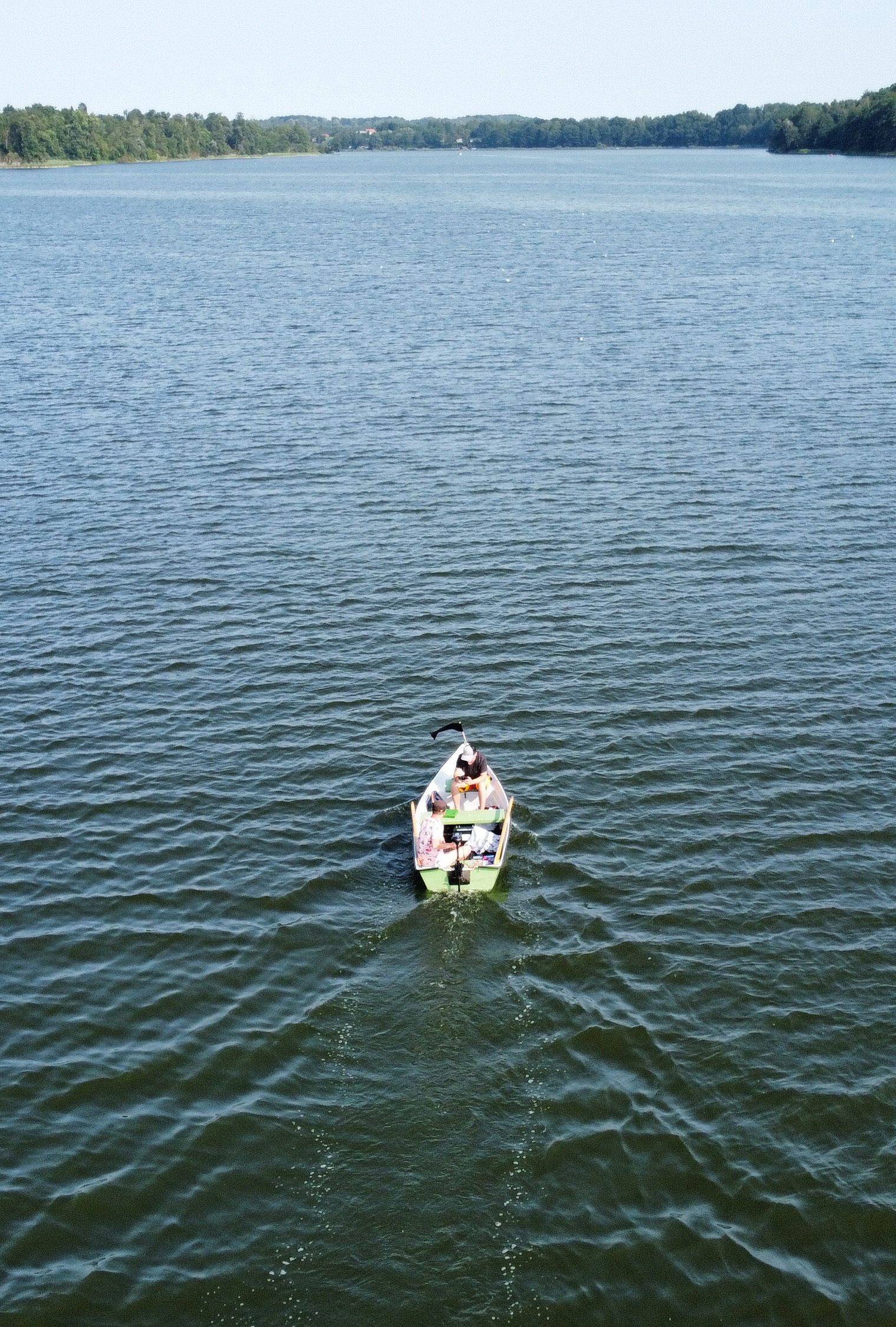
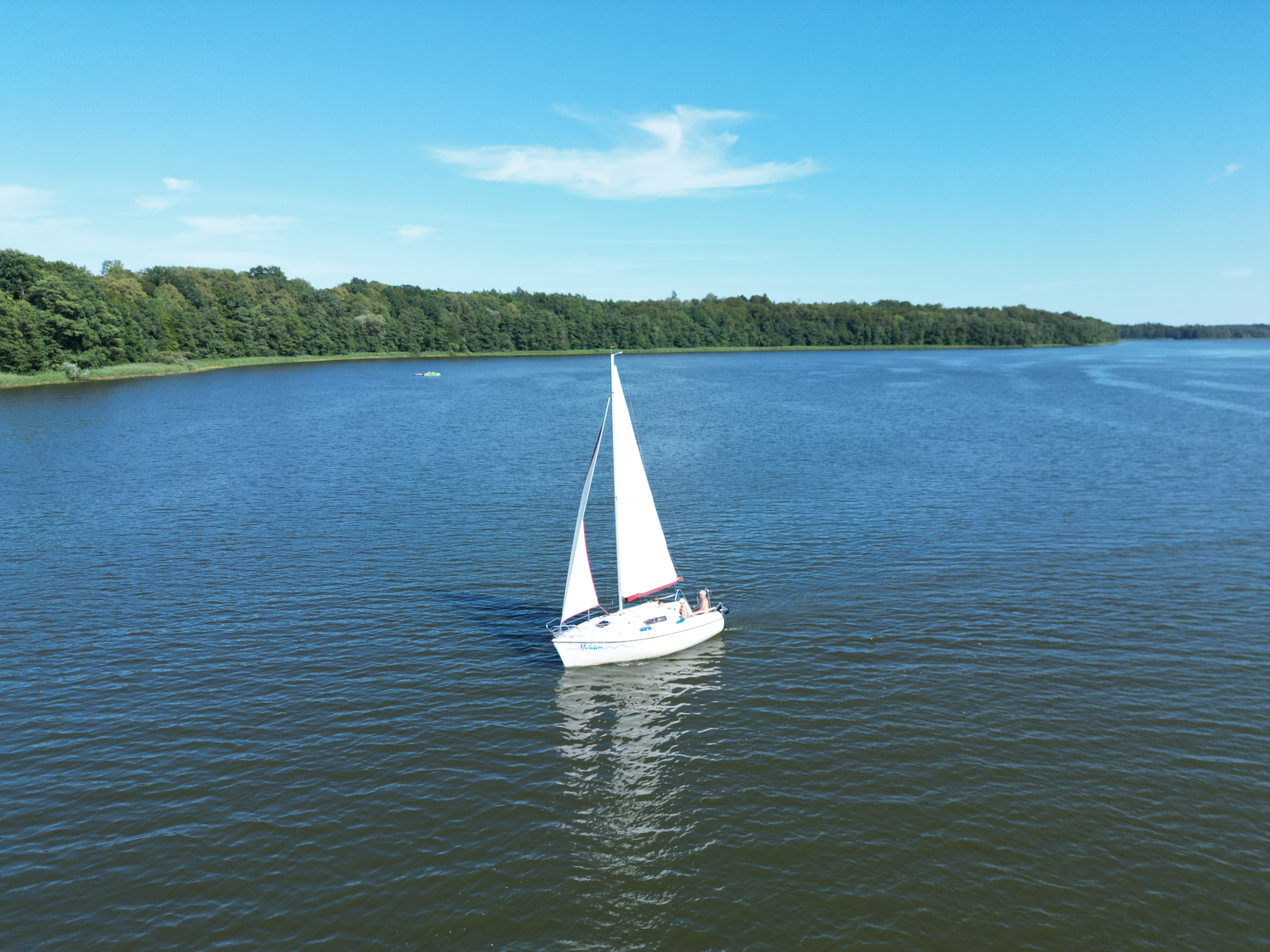
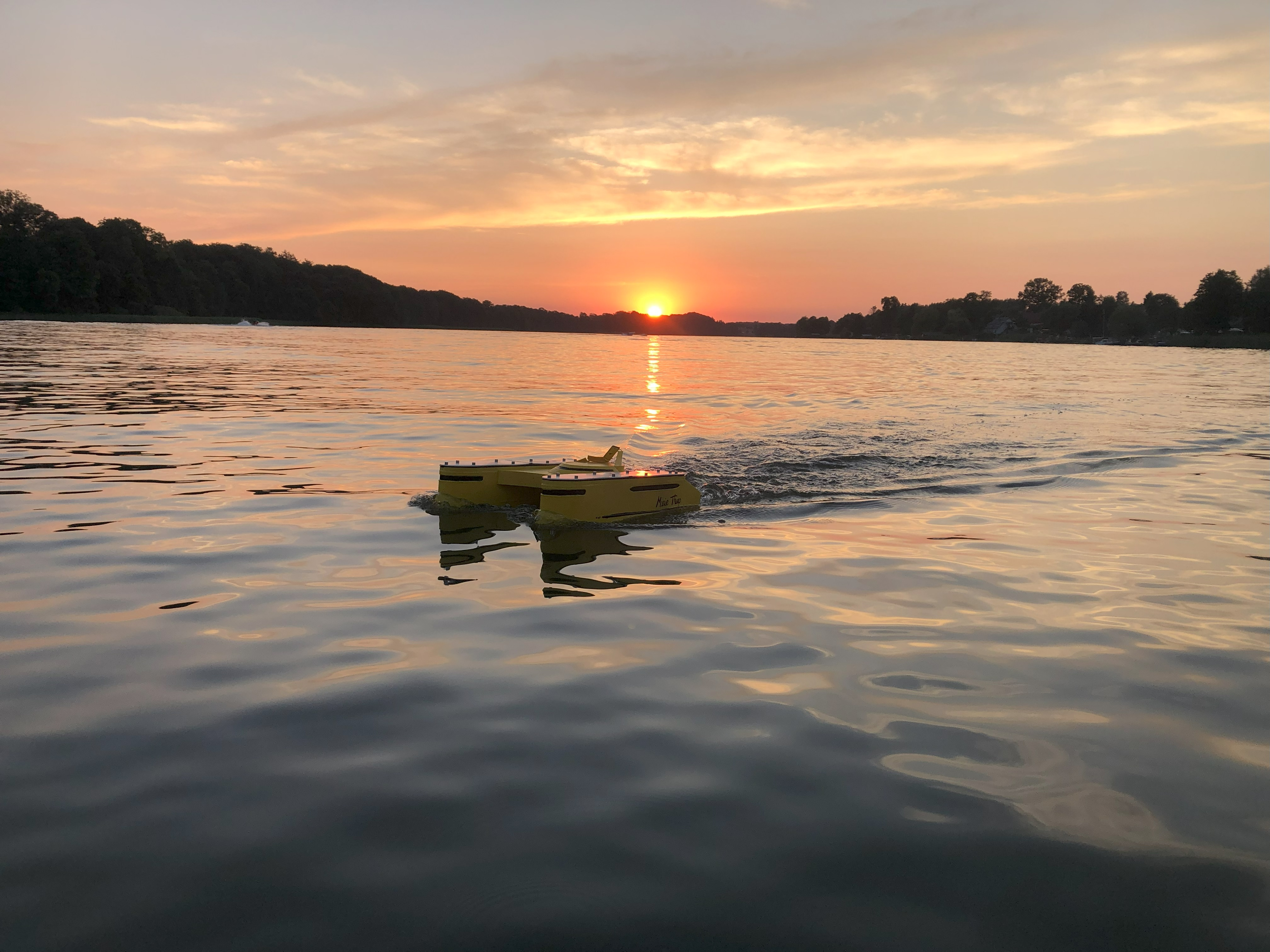
Rowing, sailing, and RC boating are some of the common water activities happening on the lake today

During the second half of the 20th century, the post-German ships serving passenger traffic on the canal were nearing the end of their operational life. In 1965-66, five SPJK-type lake and canal passenger ships (Polish: Statek Pasażerski Jeziorowo-Kanałowy) were built at the Kraków River Shipyard, each with a crew of four. The ships—Kormoran (Cormorant), Łabędź (Swan), Pingwin (Penguin), Birkut (Steppe Eagle), and Marabut (Marabou)—were popularly referred to as "little birds". They were ultimately put into service on the Ostróda-Elbląg-Ostróda route, with each trip lasting 10–11 hours one way. After 2011, the ships' route was shortened to Buczyniec-Elbląg, leading to their disappearance from Lake Ruda Woda. Currently, all traffic on the lake is conducted exclusively by private vessels.

== Fauna and flora ==
The areas surrounding the lake are characterized by rich biodiversity. The dense forests around the water, divided into smaller clusters, are dominated by alder, beech, maple, and oak trees. Among the coniferous species, pines, spruces, and often towering larches stand out. The shoreline (littoral) zone is covered by various reed communities, primarily common reed and narrowleaf cattail. Additionally, there are areas where bulrush and reed mannagrass dominate. In the shallower coastal zones and bays, aquatic plants such as yellow water lilies and European frog-bits are common, with the former being more prevalent. Among the fully submerged plants, canadian waterweed and rigid hornwort are predominant.

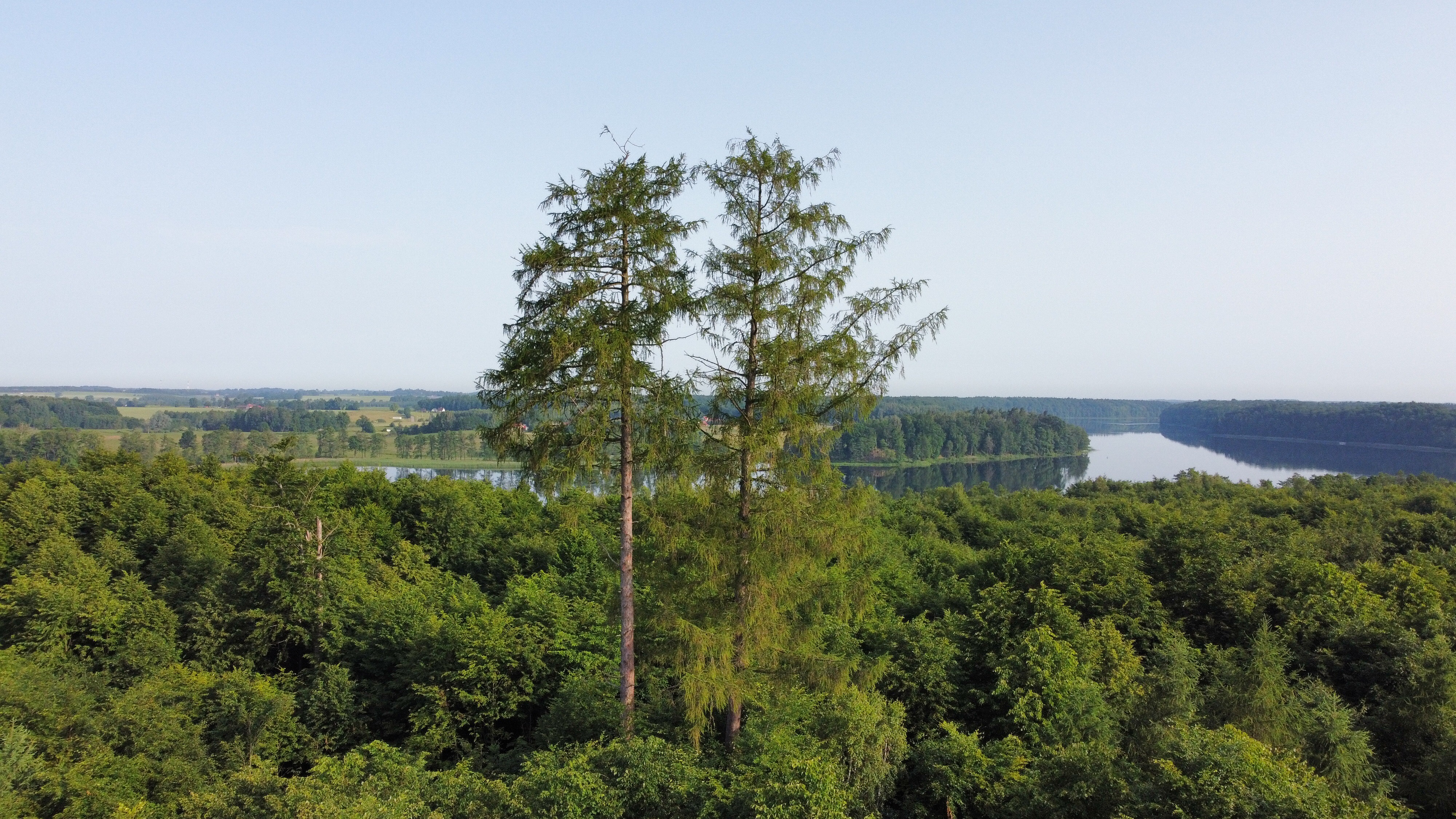
Tall larch tree reigning over the forest with lake Ruda Woda in the background

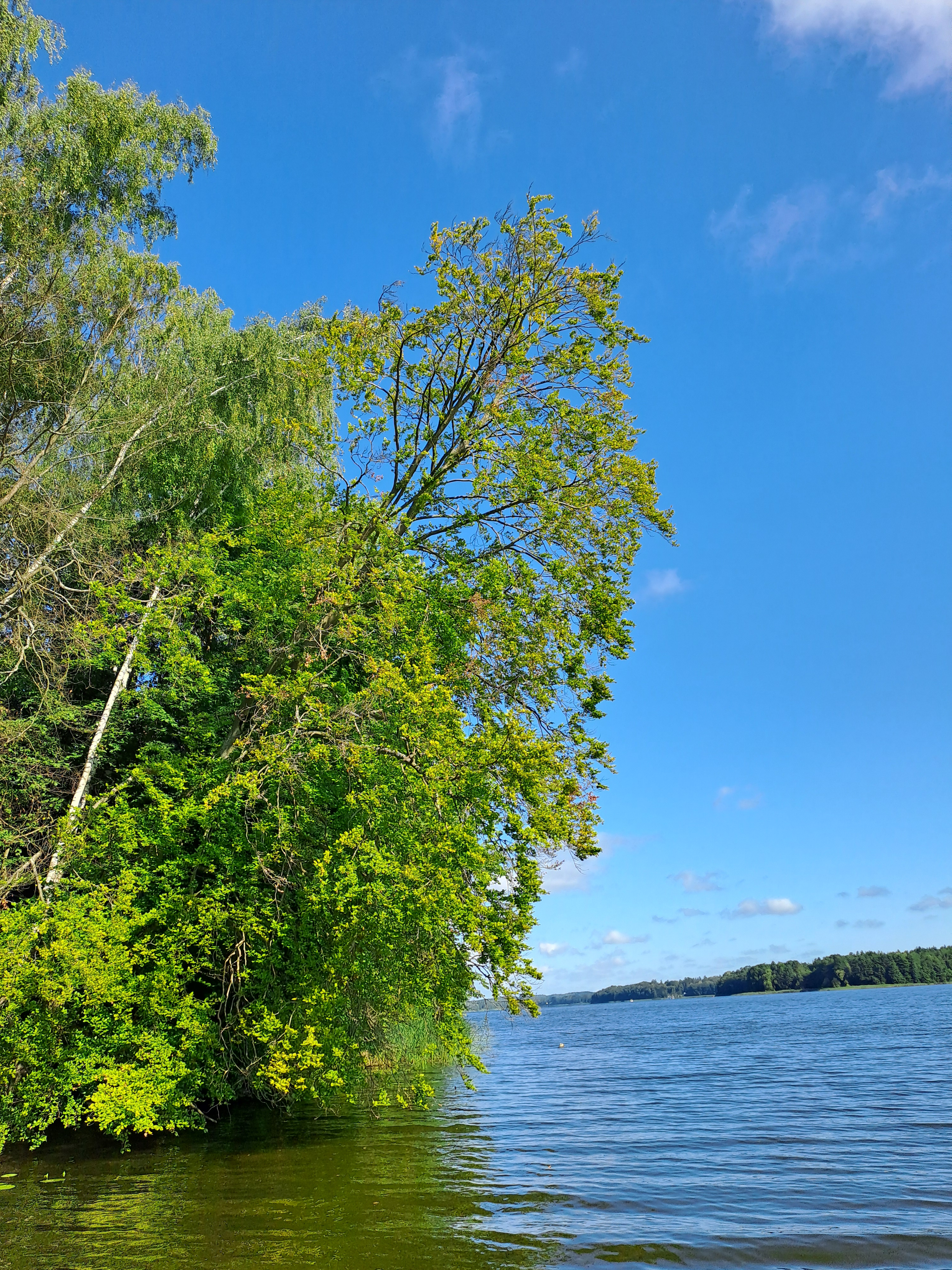
Beech tree leaning over the lake

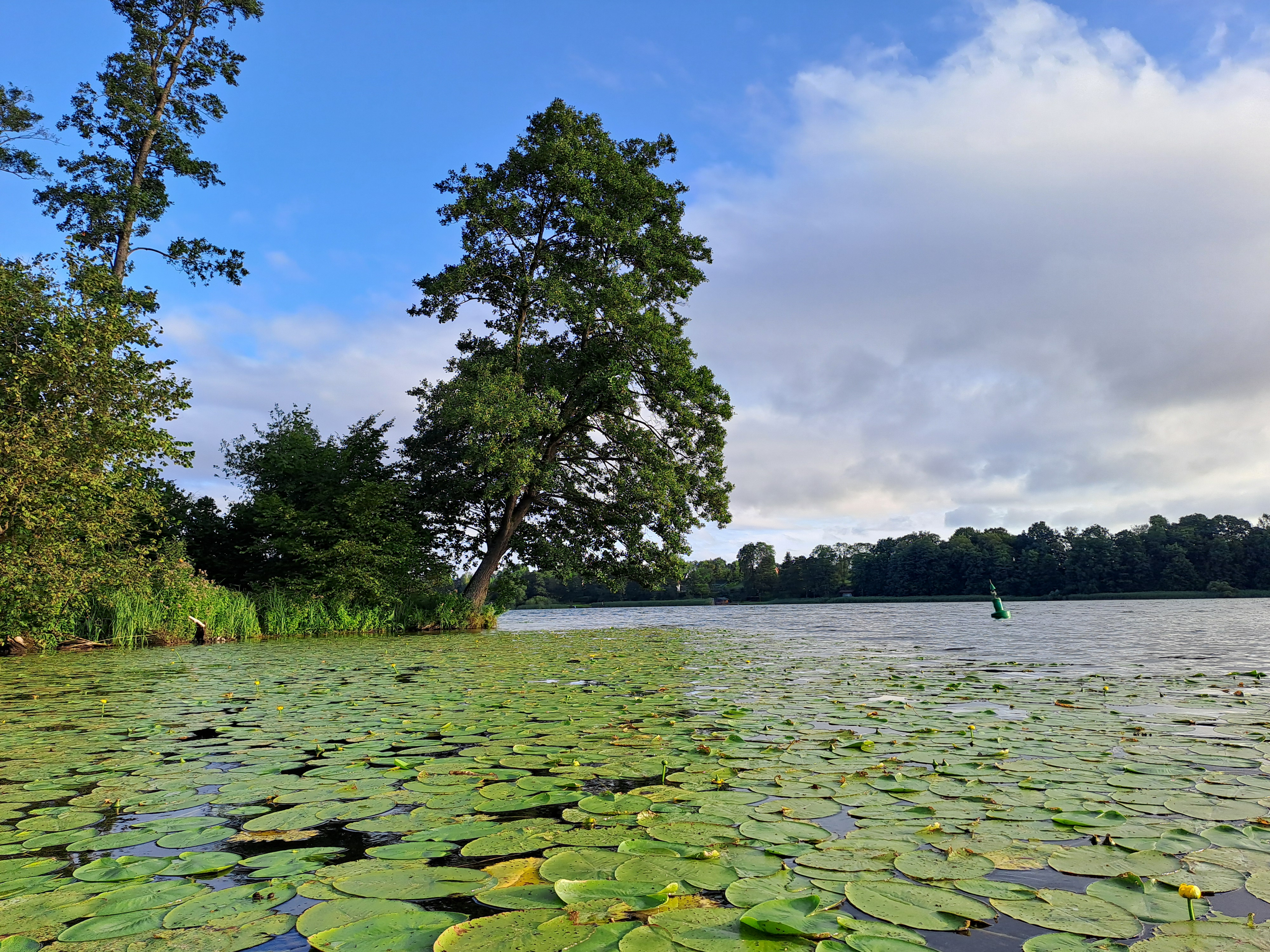
Yellow water lilies and an alder tree at the point across from the village of Wilamowo, where the lake's direction shifts

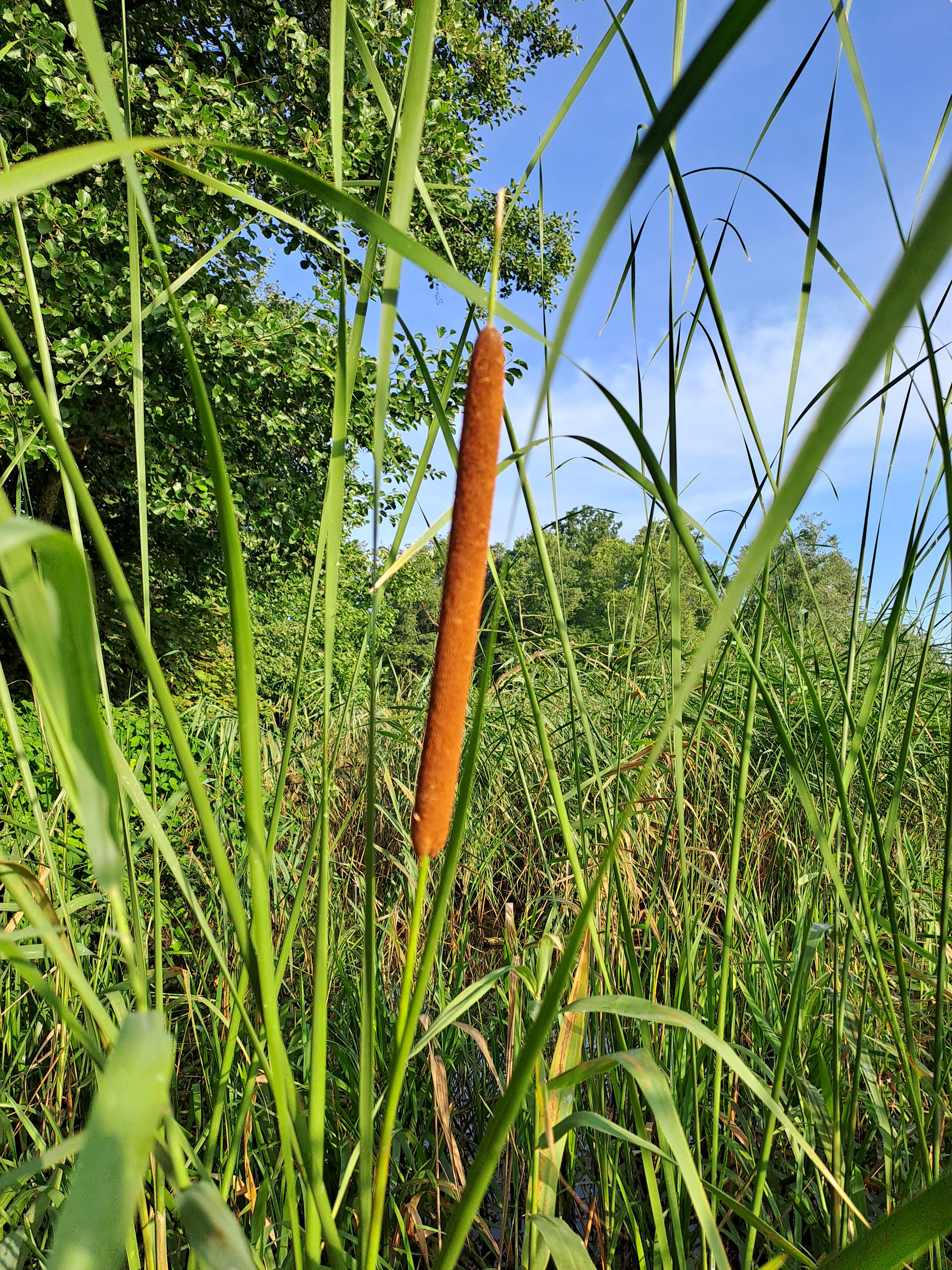
Narrowleaf cattail in the shoreline zone

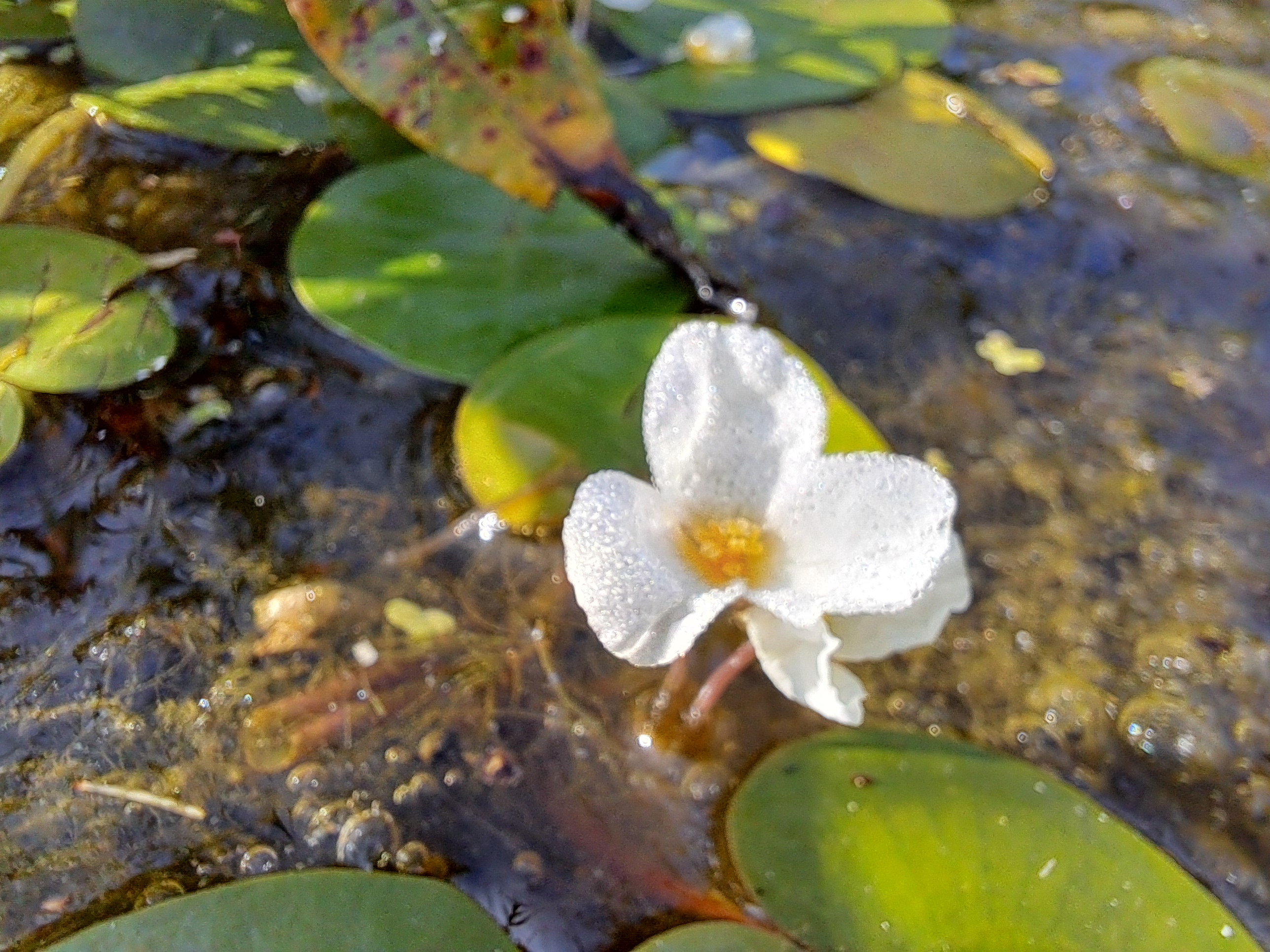
European frog-bit floating on the lake

The forested and coastal areas provide feeding and breeding grounds for numerous bird species, mainly cormorants, swans, and herons (including great egrets), along with members of the grebe, duck, gull, and tern families. Wet and shaded areas, particularly near channels connected to the lake, are inhabited by kingfishers. The lake’s fish population is dominated by perch, roach, bream, tench, pike, and zander, with increasingly rare eels also present. Other animals typical of northern Polish lake ecosystems can be found in the coastal and nearshore zones, including beavers, frogs, and toads such as the common toad and moor frog, as well as crayfish and various species of mussels, including the common freshwater mussel.

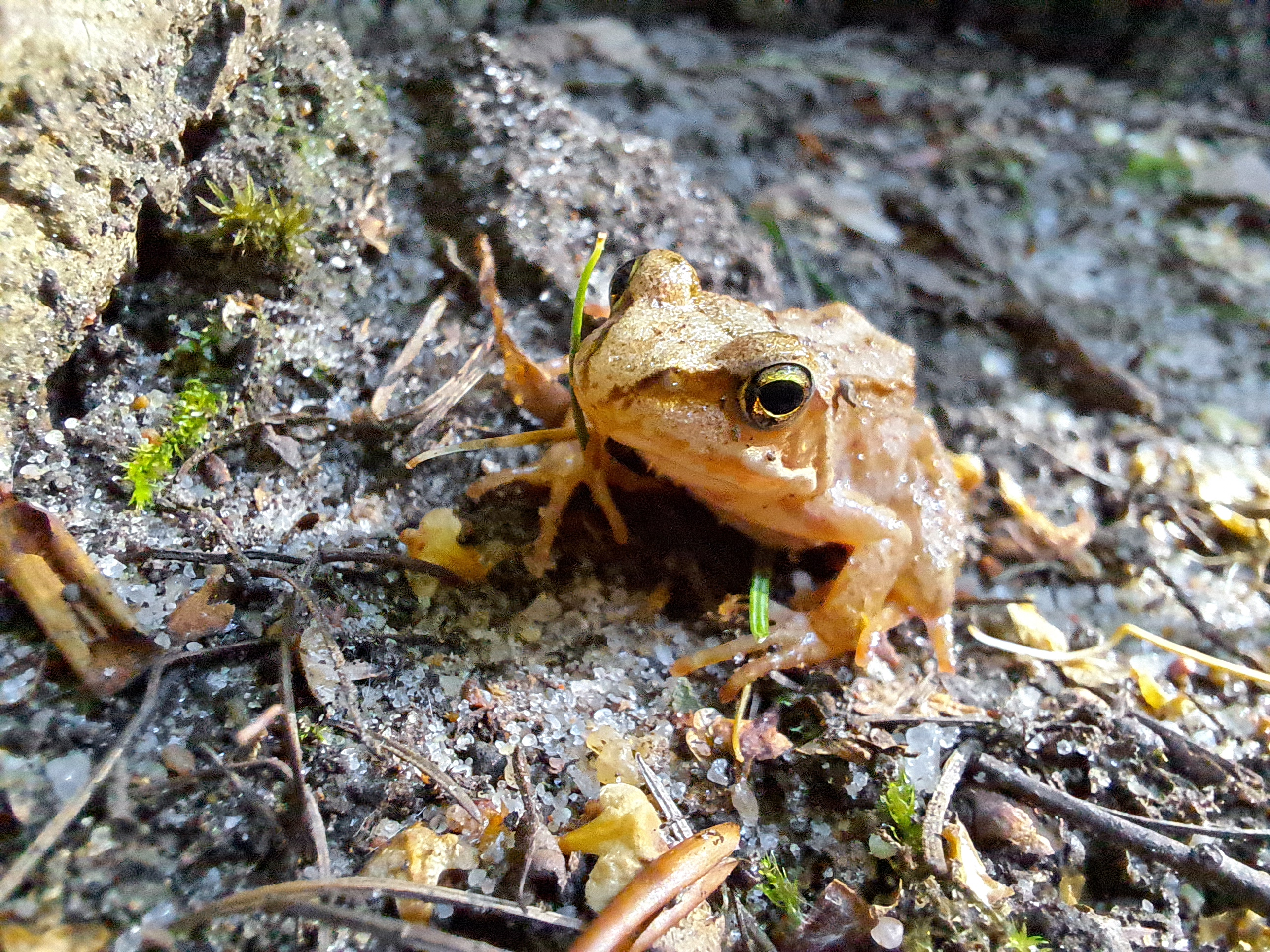
Grass Frog inhabiting the shoreline forests

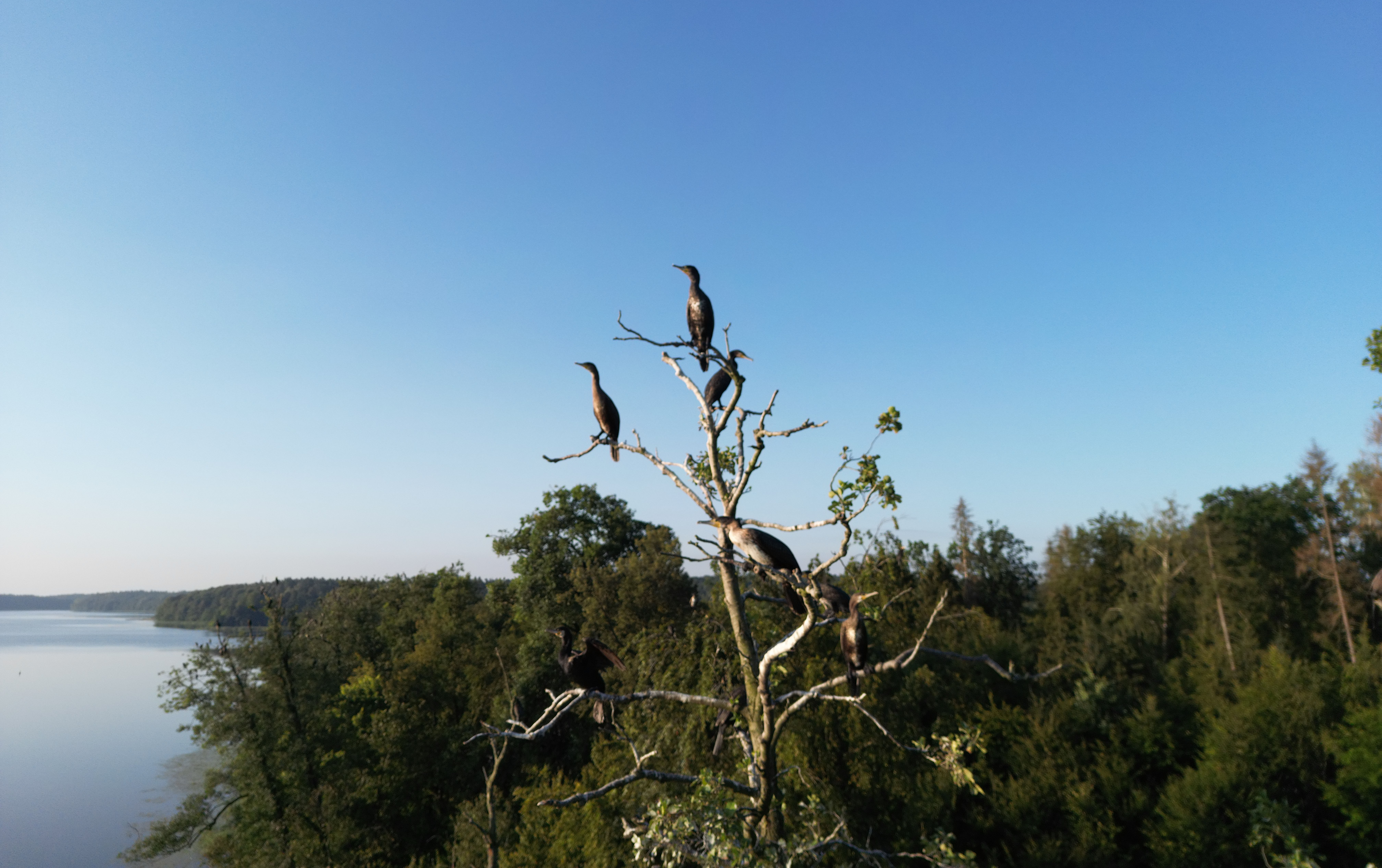
A flock of cormorants perched on a tree near the lake

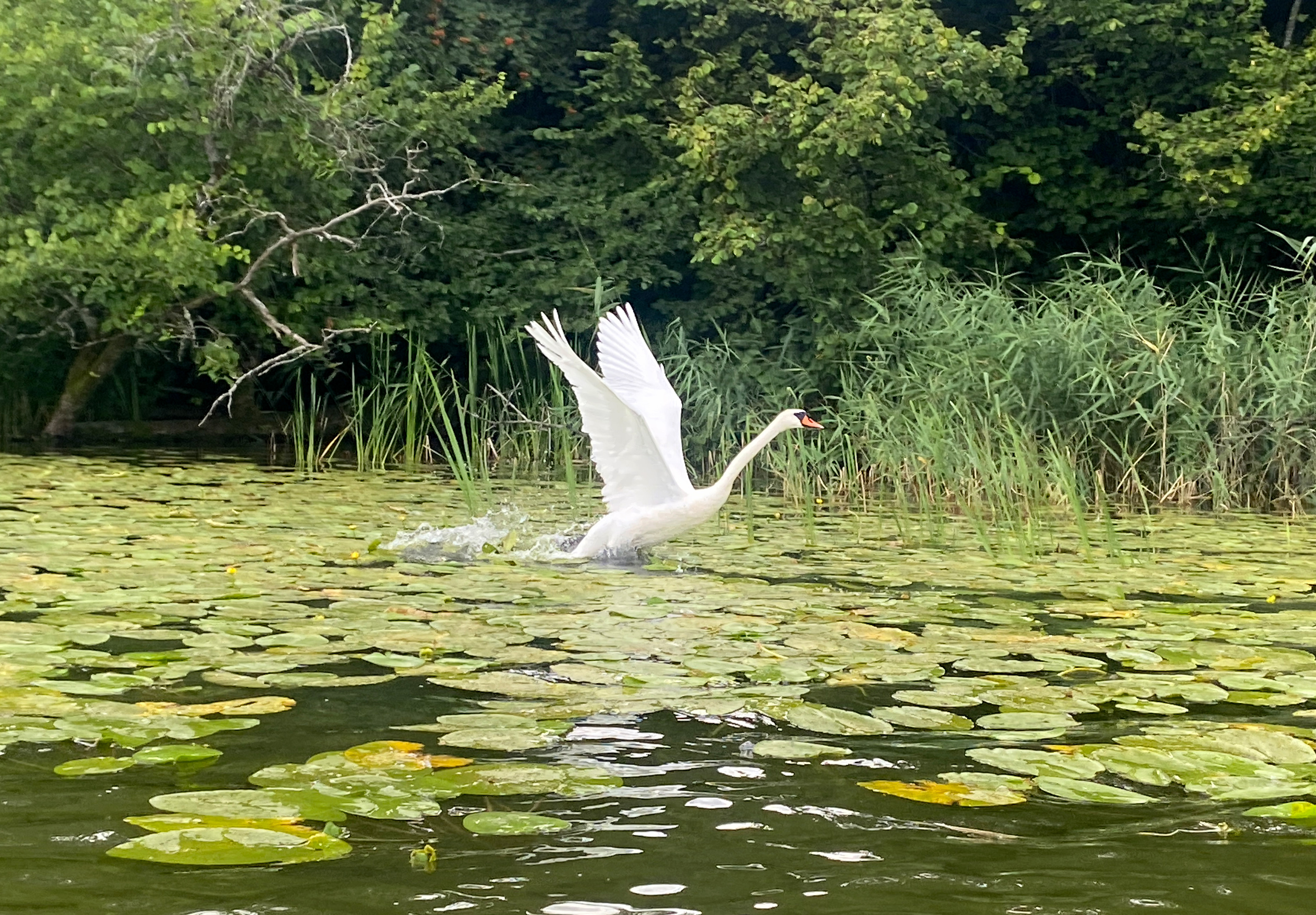
Swan taking of from the water

== See also ==
- Elbląg Canal
- East Prussia
- Glacial landform
- List of lakes of Poland
