= Ogryzkov =

Ogryzkov (Russian: Огры́зков; masculine) or Ogryzkova (Огры́зкова; feminine) is a Russian last name. Variants of this last name include Agryzkov/Agryzkova (Агры́зков/Агры́зкова) and Ogryzko (Огры́зко).

It derives from the nickname "Огрызок" (Ogryzok)—phonetically spelled "Агрызок" (Agryzok)—which derives from the dialectal Russian word "огрыза" (ogryza), meaning a rude fellow, someone giving cheek in response to any comments.

People with this last name

- Alexander Ogryzkov, member of the Soviet Union national rugby union team

== See also ==
- Ogryzkovo, several rural localities in Russia
- Agryzkovo, several rural localities in Tver Oblast, Russia
- Sebastian Kryrstian Ogryzek (or just Ogryzek), a Brazilian phonk artist centered Poland
