= Sukhaya =

Sukhaya (Russian: Сухая) is the name of several rural localities in Russia:

- Sukhaya, Alexandrovsky District, Perm Krai, a settlement in Alexandrovsky District, Perm Krai
- Sukhaya, Permsky District, Perm Krai, a village in Permsky District, Perm Krai
