= Kety =

Kety may refer to:

== People ==
- Seymour S. Kety (1915–2000), American neuroscientist

== Places ==
- Kety, Perm Krai, Russia
- Kéty, Tolna county, Hungary
- Kęty, Lesser Poland Voivodeship, Poland
- Kęty, Warmian-Masurian Voivodeship, Poland
