= Novokoshkino =

Novokoshkino Новокошкино
- Village
- Location within Perm Krai Location within Russia
- Coordinates: 58°14′N 55°16′E
- Country: Russia
- Region: Perm Krai
- District: Nytvensky District
- Time zone: UTC+5:00

Novokoshkino (Russian: Новокошкино) is a rural locality (a village) in Nytvensky District, Perm Krai, Russia. The population was 6 as of 2017.

== Geography ==
Novokoshkino is located 50 km north of Nytva (the district's administrative centre) by road. Chleny is the nearest rural locality.
