= Nytvensky =

Nytvensky (masculine), Nytvenskaya (feminine), or Nytvenskoye (neuter) may refer to:

- Nytvensky District, a district of Perm Krai, Russia
- Nytvenskoye Urban Settlement, a municipal formation which the town of Nytva and eight rural localities in Nytvensky District of Perm Krai, Russia are incorporated as
