= Surzyki =

Surzyki may refer to the following places in Poland:

- Surzyki Małe
- Surzyki Wielkie
