= Mokino =

Mokino (Russian: Мокино) is the name of several rural localities in Russia:

- Mokino, Nytvensky District, Perm Krai, a village in Nytvensky District, Perm Krai
- Mokino, Permsky District, Perm Krai, a village in Permsky District, Perm Krai
