= Ogryzkovo =

Ogryzkovo (Russian: Огрызково) is the name of several rural localities in Russia:

- Ogryzkovo, Kungursky District, Perm Krai, a village in Kungursky District of Perm Krai
- Ogryzkovo, Permsky District, Perm Krai, a village in Permsky District of Perm Krai
- Ogryzkovo, Tver Oblast, a village in Seletskoye Rural Settlement of Maksatikhinsky District in Tver Oblast
- Ogryzkovo, Vologda Oblast, a village in Nizhneyentalsky Selsoviet of Kichmengsko-Gorodetsky District in Vologda Oblast
