= Sarna =

Sarna may refer to:

== People ==
- Sarna (Polish surname)
- Sarna (Punjabi surname)

== Places ==
- Sarna, Warmian-Masurian Voivodeship, a village in northern Poland
- Sarna sthal, a place of worship in India
- Särna, a locality in Dalarna County, Sweden

== Science and medicine ==
- Small activating RNA (saRNA)
- Sarna (drug), see List of drugs: S-Sd
- Self-amplifying RNA (also termed saRNA or SAM)

== Other ==
- Sarna (place), sacred places in Sarnaism

== See also ==
- Sarnaism, the religious beliefs held by tribes in the state of Jharkhand, India, and other central Indian states
- Srna (disambiguation)
