= Mokino, Nytvensky District, Perm Krai =

Mokino Мокино
- Selo
- Location within Perm Krai Location within Russia
- Coordinates: 58°06′N 55°19′E
- Country: Russia
- Region: Perm Krai
- District: Nytvensky District
- Time zone: UTC+5:00

Mokino (Russian: Мо́кино) is a rural locality (a selo) in Nytvensky District, Perm Krai, Russia. The population was 773 as of 2017. There are 8 streets.

== Geography ==
Mokino is located 26 km north of Nytva (the district's administrative centre) by road. Posnyata is the nearest rural locality.
