= Kuliki, Permsky District, Perm Krai =

Kuliki Кулики
- Village
- Location within Perm Krai Location within Russia
- Coordinates: 57°56′N 55°49′E
- Country: Russia
- Region: Perm Krai
- District: Permsky District
- Time zone: UTC+5:00

Kuliki (Russian: Кулики) is a rural locality (a village) in Kultayevskoye Rural Settlement, Permsky District, Perm Krai, Russia. The population was 26 as of 2010. There are 24 streets.

== Geography ==
Kuliki is located 43 km southwest of Perm (the district's administrative centre) by road. Denisyata is the nearest rural locality.
