= Kachka =

Kachka Качка
- Village
- Location within Perm Krai Location within Russia
- Coordinates: 57°59′N 55°45′E
- Country: Russia
- Region: Perm Krai
- District: Permsky District
- Time zone: UTC+5:00

Kachka (Russian: Качка) is a rural locality (a village) in Ust-Kachkinskoye Rural Settlement, Permsky District, Perm Krai, Russia. The population was 103 as of 2010. There are 19 streets.

== Geography ==
Kachka is located 48 km west of Perm (the district's administrative centre) by road. Krasny Voskhod is the nearest rural locality.
