= Bizyar =

Bizyar Бизяр
- Selo
- Location within Perm Krai Location within Russia
- Coordinates: 57°31′N 56°08′E
- Country: Russia
- Region: Perm Krai
- District: Permsky District
- Time zone: UTC+5:00

Bizyar (Russian: Бизяр) is a rural locality (a selo) in Palnikovskoye Rural Settlement, Permsky District, Perm Krai, Russia. The population was 70 as of 2010. There are 10 streets.

== Geography ==
Bizyar is located 75 km south of Perm (the district's administrative centre) by road. Sukhobizyarka is the nearest rural locality.
