= Lugovaya (Ust-Kachkinskoye Rural Settlement), Permsky District, Perm Krai =

Lugovaya Луговая
- Village
- Location within Perm Krai Location within Russia
- Coordinates: 57°57′N 55°36′E
- Country: Russia
- Region: Perm Krai
- District: Permsky District
- Time zone: UTC+5:00

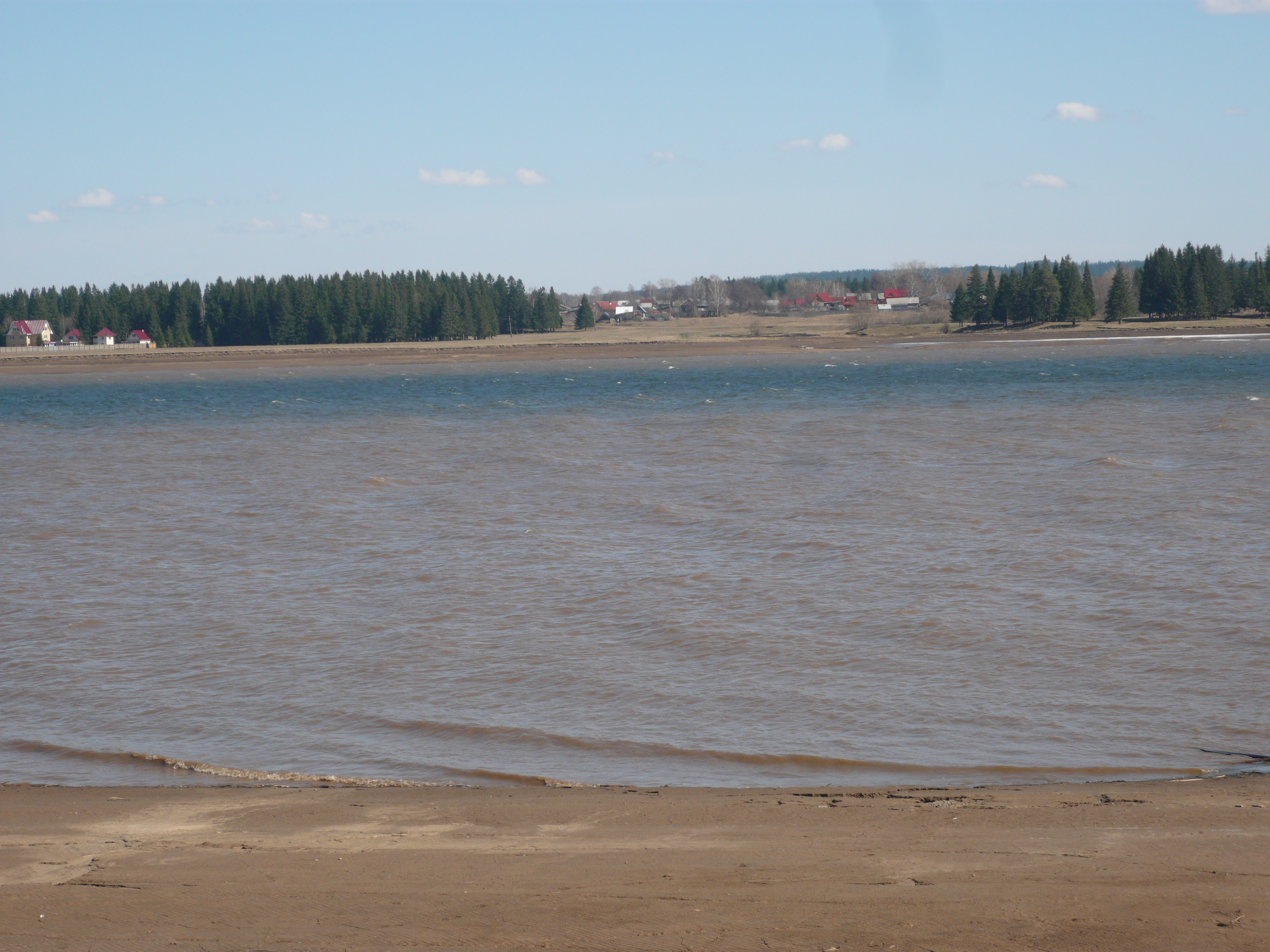
Lugovaya village

Lugovaya (Russian: Луговая) is a rural locality (a village) in Ust-Kachkinskoye Rural Settlement, Permsky District, Perm Krai, Russia. The population was 140 as of 2010. There are 29 streets.

== Geography ==
It is located 9.5 km south-west from Ust-Kachka.
