= Baybolovka =

Baybolovka Байболовка
- Village
- Location within Perm Krai Location within Russia
- Coordinates: 57°35′N 56°29′E
- Country: Russia
- Region: Perm Krai
- District: Permsky District
- Time zone: UTC+5:00

Baybolovka (Russian: Байболовка) is a rural locality (a village) in Kukushtanskoye Rural Settlement, Permsky District, Perm Krai, Russia. The population was 808 as of 2010. There are 17 streets.

== Geography ==
Baybolovka is located 55 km south of Perm (the district's administrative centre) by road. Sukho-Platoshino is the nearest rural locality.
