= Zaosinovo =

Zaosinovo Заосиново
- Village
- Location within Perm Krai Location within Russia
- Coordinates: 57°59′N 55°59′E
- Country: Russia
- Region: Perm Krai
- District: Permsky District
- Time zone: UTC+5:00

Zaosinovo (Russian: Заосиново) is a rural locality (a village) in Kondratovskoye Rural Settlement, Permsky District, Perm Krai, Russia. The population was 156 as of 2010.

== Geography ==
Zaosinovo is located 17 km west of Perm (the district's administrative centre) by road. Bereg Kamy is the nearest rural locality.
