= Petrovka, Perm Krai =

Petrovka Петровка
- Village
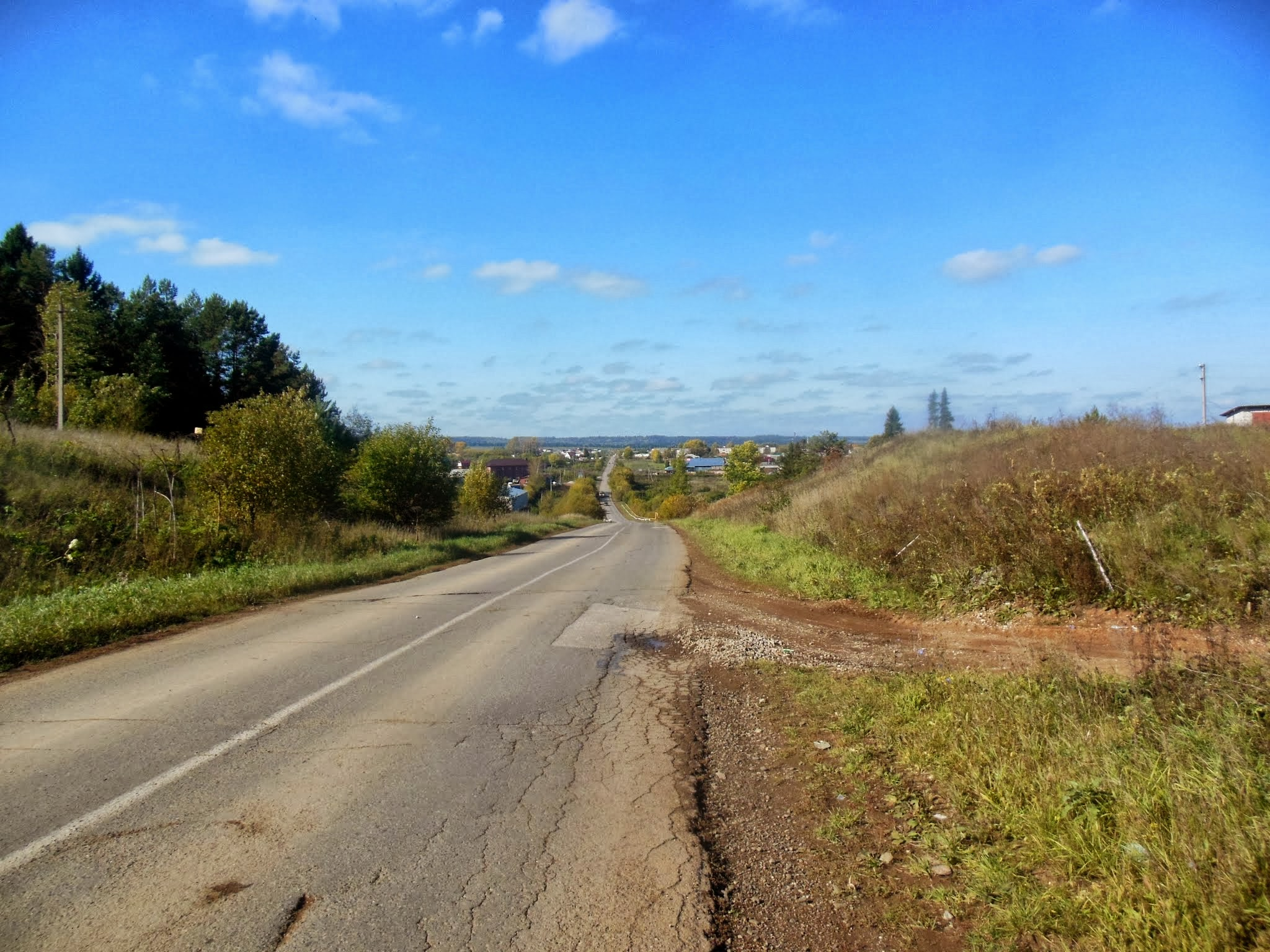
- Section of a road in Permsky District, Perm Krai, Russia

- Location within Perm Krai Location within Russia
- Coordinates: 57°55′N 55°53′E
- Country: Russia
- Region: Perm Krai
- District: Permsky District
- Time zone: UTC+5:00

Petrovka (Russian: Петровка) is a rural locality (a village) in Kultayevskoye Rural Settlement, Permsky District, Perm Krai, Russia. The population was 1,326 as of 2010. There are 23 streets.

== Geography ==
Petrovka is located 27 km southwest of Perm (the district's administrative centre) by road. Murashi is the nearest rural locality.
