= Morgali =

Morgali Моргали
- Village
- Location within Perm Krai Location within Russia
- Coordinates: 57°56′N 55°36′E
- Country: Russia
- Region: Perm Krai
- District: Permsky District
- Time zone: UTC+5:00

Morgali (Russian: Моргали) is a rural locality (a village) in Ust-Kachkinskoye Rural Settlement, Permsky District, Perm Krai, Russia. The population was 5 as of 2010. There is 1 street.

== Geography ==
Morgali is located 57 km west of Perm (the district's administrative centre) by road. Zaozerye is the nearest rural locality.
