= Rastyagayevo =

Rastyagayevo Растягаево
- Village
- Location within Perm Krai Location within Russia
- Coordinates: 57°56′N 55°44′E
- Country: Russia
- Region: Perm Krai
- District: Permsky District
- Time zone: UTC+5:00

Rastyagayevo (Russian: Растягаево) is a rural locality (a village) in Zabolotskoye Rural Settlement, Permsky District, Perm Krai, Russia. The population was 158 as of 2010. There are 9 streets.

== Geography ==
Rastyagayevo is located 41 km southwest of Perm (the district's administrative centre) by road. Gorshki is the nearest rural locality.
