= Mostovaya (Sylvenskoye Rural Settlement), Permsky District, Perm Krai =

Mostovaya Мостовая
- Village
- Location within Perm Krai Location within Russia
- Coordinates: 57°59′N 56°43′E
- Country: Russia
- Region: Perm Krai
- District: Permsky District
- Time zone: UTC+5:00

Mostovaya (Russian: Мостовая) is a rural locality (a village) in Sylvenskoye Rural Settlement, Permsky District, Perm Krai, Russia. The population was 49 as of 2010. There are 35 streets.

== Geography ==
Mostovaya is located 44 km southeast of Perm (the district's administrative centre) by road. Nazarovo is the nearest rural locality.
