= Brody, Perm Krai =

Brody Броды
- Village
- Location within Perm Krai Location within Russia
- Coordinates: 57°56′N 56°27′E
- Country: Russia
- Region: Perm Krai
- District: Permsky District
- Time zone: UTC+5:00

Brody (Russian: Броды) is a rural locality (a village) in Frolovskoye Rural Settlement, Permsky District, Perm Krai, Russia. The population was 142 as of 2010. There are 8 streets.

== Geography ==
Brody is located 19 km southeast of Perm (the district's administrative centre) by road. Sofrony is the nearest rural locality.
