= Sokol, Perm Krai =

Sokol Сокол
- Settlement
- Location within Perm Krai Location within Russia
- Coordinates: 57°54′N 56°02′E
- Country: Russia
- Region: Perm Krai
- District: Permsky District
- Time zone: UTC+5:00

Sokol (Russian: Сокол) is a rural locality (a settlement) in Savinskoye Rural Settlement, Permsky District, Perm Krai, Russia. The population was 1,674 as of 2010. There are 2 streets.

== Geography ==
Sokol is located 24 km southwest of Perm (the district's administrative centre) by road. Strashnaya is the nearest rural locality.
