= Pishchalnikovo =

Pishchalnikovo Пищальниково
- Rural locality
- Location within Perm Krai Location within Russia
- Coordinates: 57°56′N 55°52′E
- Country: Russia
- Region: Perm Krai
- District: Permsky
- Time zone: UTC+5:00

Pishchalnikovo (Russian: Пищальниково) is a rural locality in the Kultayevskoye Rural Settlement of the Permsky District in Perm Krai, Russia. The population was 116 as of 2010. There are 7 streets.

== Geography ==
Pishchalnikovo is located 29 km southwest of Perm (the district's administrative centre) by road. Ust-Tary is the nearest rural locality.
