= Rassolino =

Rassolino Рассолино
- Village
- Location within Perm Krai Location within Russia
- Coordinates: 57°44′N 56°35′E
- Country: Russia
- Region: Perm Krai
- District: Permsky District
- Time zone: UTC+5:00

Rassolino (Russian: Рассолино) is a rural locality (a village) in Kukushtanskoye Rural Settlement, Permsky District, Perm Krai, Russia. The population was 23 as of 2010.

== Geography ==
Rassolino is located 46 km southeast of Perm (the district's administrative centre) by road. Verkhnyaya Rassolnaya is the nearest rural locality.
