= Strashnaya =

Strashnaya Страшная
- Village
- Location within Perm Krai Location within Russia
- Coordinates: 57°53′N 56°03′E
- Country: Russia
- Region: Perm Krai
- District: Permsky District
- Time zone: UTC+5:00

Strashnaya (Russian: Страшная) is a rural locality (a village) in Gamovskoye Rural Settlement, Permsky District, Perm Krai, Russia. The population was 21 as of 2010.

== Geography ==
Strashnaya is located 22 km southwest of Perm (the district's administrative centre) by road. Gusyata is the nearest rural locality.
