= Bykovka =

Bykovka Быковка
- Village
- Location within Perm Krai Location within Russia
- Coordinates: 58°03′N 56°45′E
- Country: Russia
- Region: Perm Krai
- District: Permsky District
- Time zone: UTC+5:00

Bykovka (Russian: Быковка) is a rural locality (a village) in Sylvenskoye Rural Settlement, Permsky District, Perm Krai, Russia. The population was 13 as of 2010.

== Geography ==
Bykovka is located on the Sylva River, 38 km east of Perm (the district's administrative centre) by road.
