= Bolshakino =

Bolshakino Большакино
- Village
- Location within Perm Krai Location within Russia
- Coordinates: 57°54′N 55°46′E
- Country: Russia
- Region: Perm Krai
- District: Permsky District
- Time zone: UTC+5:00

Bolshakino (Russian: Большакино) is a rural locality (a village) in Zabolotskoye Rural Settlement, Permsky District, Perm Krai, Russia. The population was 122 as of 2010. There are 40 streets.

== Geography ==
Bolshakino is located 36 km southwest of Perm (the district's administrative centre) by road. Aleksiki and Shugurovka are the nearest rural localities.
