= Krokhovo =

Krokhovo Крохово
- Village
- Location within Perm Krai Location within Russia
- Coordinates: 57°55′N 56°01′E
- Country: Russia
- Region: Perm Krai
- District: Permsky District
- Time zone: UTC+5:00

Krokhovo (Russian: Крохово) is a rural locality (a village) in Savinskoye Rural Settlement, Permsky District, Perm Krai, Russia. The population was 393 as of 2010. There are five streets.

== Geography ==
Krokhovo is located 19 km southwest of Perm (the district's administrative centre) by road. Bolshoye Savino is the nearest rural locality.
