= Pesyanka =

Pesyanka Песьянка
- Village
- Location within Perm Krai Location within Russia
- Coordinates: 57°53′N 56°06′E
- Country: Russia
- Region: Perm Krai
- District: Permsky District
- Time zone: UTC+5:00

Pesyanka (Russian: Песьянка) is a rural locality (a village). It was the administrative center of the disestablished Savinskoye rural settlement, Permsky District, Perm Krai, Russia. The population was 2,814 as of 2010.

Pesyanka is located 15 km southwest of Perm (the district's administrative centre) by road.
