= Kosoturikha =

Kosoturikha Косотуриха
- Village
- Location within Perm Krai Location within Russia
- Coordinates: 57°52′N 55°53′E
- Country: Russia
- Region: Perm Krai
- District: Permsky District
- Time zone: UTC+5:00

Kosoturikha (Russian: Косотуриха) is a rural locality (a village) in Kultayevskoye Rural Settlement, Permsky District, Perm Krai, Russia. The population was 270 as of 2010. There are 36 streets.

== Geography ==
Kosoturikha is located 29 km southwest of Perm (the district's administrative centre) by road. Protasy is the nearest rural locality.
