= Klyuchi, Permsky District, Perm Krai =

Klyuchi Ключи
- Village
- Location within Perm Krai Location within Russia
- Coordinates: 57°49′N 56°27′E
- Country: Russia
- Region: Perm Krai
- District: Permsky District
- Time zone: UTC+5:00

Klyuchi (Russian: Ключи) is a rural locality (a village) in Lobanovskoye Rural Settlement, Permsky District, Perm Krai, Russia. It has five streets, and a population of 16 as of 2010.

== Geography ==
Klyuchi is located 29 km southeast of Perm (the district's administrative centre) by road. Koltsovo is the nearest rural locality.
