= Sarn =

Sarn may refer to:

== Fiction ==
- Admiral Sarn, a fictional character in the game Rebel Assault II
- Precious Bane (French title: Sarn), a novel by Mary Webb

== Places ==
- Sarn, Bridgend, Wales, a village
  - Sarn railway station
- Sarn, Flintshire, Wales; a UK location
- Sarn, Powys, Wales, a village
- Sarn, Switzerland, a former municipality

== Other ==
- Sarn (Martian crater)
- Amélie Sarn, French writer

== See also ==
- Sarna (disambiguation)
