= Verkh-Rechki =

Verkh-Rechki Верх-Речки
- Village
- Location within Perm Krai Location within Russia
- Coordinates: 58°05′N 56°37′E
- Country: Russia
- Region: Perm Krai
- District: Permsky District
- Time zone: UTC+5:00

Verkh-Rechki (Russian: Верх-Речки) is a rural locality (a village) in Sylvenskoye Rural Settlement, Permsky District, Perm Krai, Russia. The population was 7 as of 2010. There are 8 streets.

== Geography ==
Verkh-Rechki is located 34 km northeast of Perm (the district's administrative centre) by road. Lyady is the nearest rural locality.
