= Ustinovo =

Ustinovo Устиново
- Village
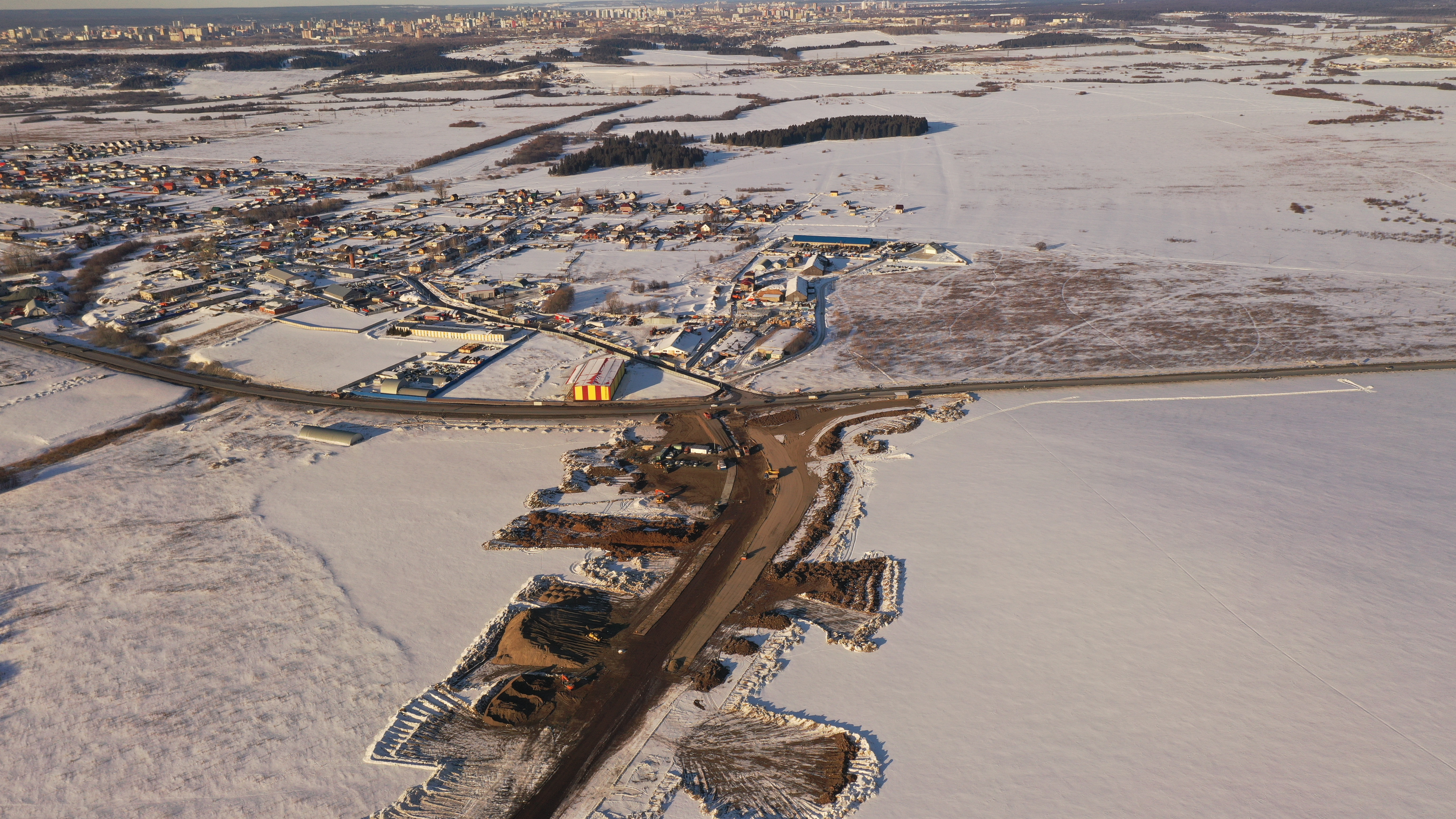

- Location within Perm Krai Location within Russia
- Coordinates: 57°54′N 56°12′E
- Country: Russia
- Region: Perm Krai
- District: Permsky District
- Time zone: UTC+5:00

Ustinovo (Russian: Устиново) is a rural locality (a village) in Dvurechenskoye Rural Settlement, Permsky District, Perm Krai, Russia. The population was 548 as of 2010. There are 25 streets.

== Geography ==
Ustinovo is located 16 km south of Perm (the district's administrative centre) by road. Subbotino is the nearest rural locality.
