= Staroverovo =

Staroverovo Староверово
- Village
- Location within Perm Krai Location within Russia
- Coordinates: 57°50′N 56°44′E
- Country: Russia
- Region: Perm Krai
- District: Permsky District
- Time zone: UTC+5:00

Staroverovo (Russian: Староверово) is a rural locality (a village) in Dvurechenskoye Rural Settlement, Permsky District, Perm Krai, Russia. The population was 4 as of 2010. There are 4 streets.

== Geography ==
Staroverovo is located 49 km southeast of Perm (the district's administrative centre) by road. Gruzdi is the nearest rural locality.
