= Johannes von Eben =

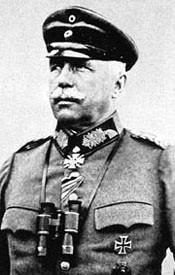
- Born: 24 February 1855; Preußisch Mark, Province of Prussia, Kingdom of Prussia
- Died: 30 June 1924 (aged 69); Bauditten, Weimar Germany
- Military career
- Allegiance: German Empire
- Branch: Imperial German Army
- Service years: 1873–1919
- Rank: General der Infanterie
- Conflicts: World War I

Johannes Karl Louis Richard Eben, from 1906 named von Eben (24 February 1855 – 30 June 1924) was a Prussian officer who served as a German general of the infantry in World War I.

== Early life ==
Johanness Karl Louis Richard Eben was born in Preußisch Mark, the son of the manor owner Ferdinand Wilhelm Eben, who is considered the actual founder of the estate which he acquired in 1855 with his wife Agnes (née Monod de Forideville; born 1 March 1822 – death unknown).

Johannes von Eben began his military career as a cadet with the Potsdam Cadet Corps and the Prussian Hauptkadettenanstalt. Upon completion he joined the 2nd Hanseatische Infantry Regiment Nr. 76 located within the Hanseatic Free cities of Hamburg and Lübeck on 19 April 1873, with the position of Portepee-Fähnrich. He received his commission of second lieutenant, earning his "sword knot" on 15 December. His first assignment was to the Füsilier-Battalion in Lübeck. Six months later he was transferred to the Hamburg Musketeers. On 1 October 1878 he was assigned to the Military Exercise Institute in Berlin for a six-month course. Upon his return he became adjutant at II Battalion from 1 June 1879 to 30 September 1882. On 14 October 1882 to October 1883, he served with the 17th Regiment. Johannes von Eben was promoted to first lieutenant on 14 April 1885. His abilities were recognized by his superiors and he was sent to the "Kriegsakademie" (Military Academy) in Berlin from 1 October 1886 to 24 July 1889. Upon completion, he returned to the 17th Regiment. Eben was promoted to captain on 24 March 1890 and appointed company commander of the 9th Company in Lübeck, 14 May 1890. From 7 July through 22 July 1891 he participated in the IX Army Corps General Staff exercise tour; and again on 4 July through 20 July in 1892.

Johannes von Eben was transferred to the general staff of the 12th Division in Neisse on 17 November 1892. He was appointed to the General Staff of the Army on 15 December 1894. Upon his promotion to major on 12 September 1895 he was assigned to the Kriegsakademie in Berlin as a tactics teacher for five years beginning 1 October 1895. He also participated at this time from 27 April to 9 May 1899 in an information course at the Infantry-Artillery School at Spandau.

Johannes was transferred on 20 November 1900 to the Spandau 5th Guards Infantry, where he was given command of the First Battalion. Two years later, on 22 March 1902, he returned to the General Staff of the Army and transferred to the XVII Army Corps in Danzig, as its general staff officer. His promotion to lieutenant colonel came on 22 April 1902 as he served with the XVII Army Corps.

In 1905, he was given the post of Army Chief of Department in the Ministry of War in Berlin. For his achievements, Kaiser Wilhelm II elevated him into Prussian hereditary peerage on 29 August 1906 with the official title of "von" added to his name. Two years later he became commander of the Grenadier Guards Regiment No. 5 in Spandau. On 24 March 1909, he was promoted to major general and given command of the 5th Guards Infantry Brigade. On Kaiser Wilhelm II's birthday, he was given the command of the 30th Division on 27 January 1912. Shortly afterwards, Johannes von Eben was promoted to lieutenant-general on 22 April 1912.

== World War ==
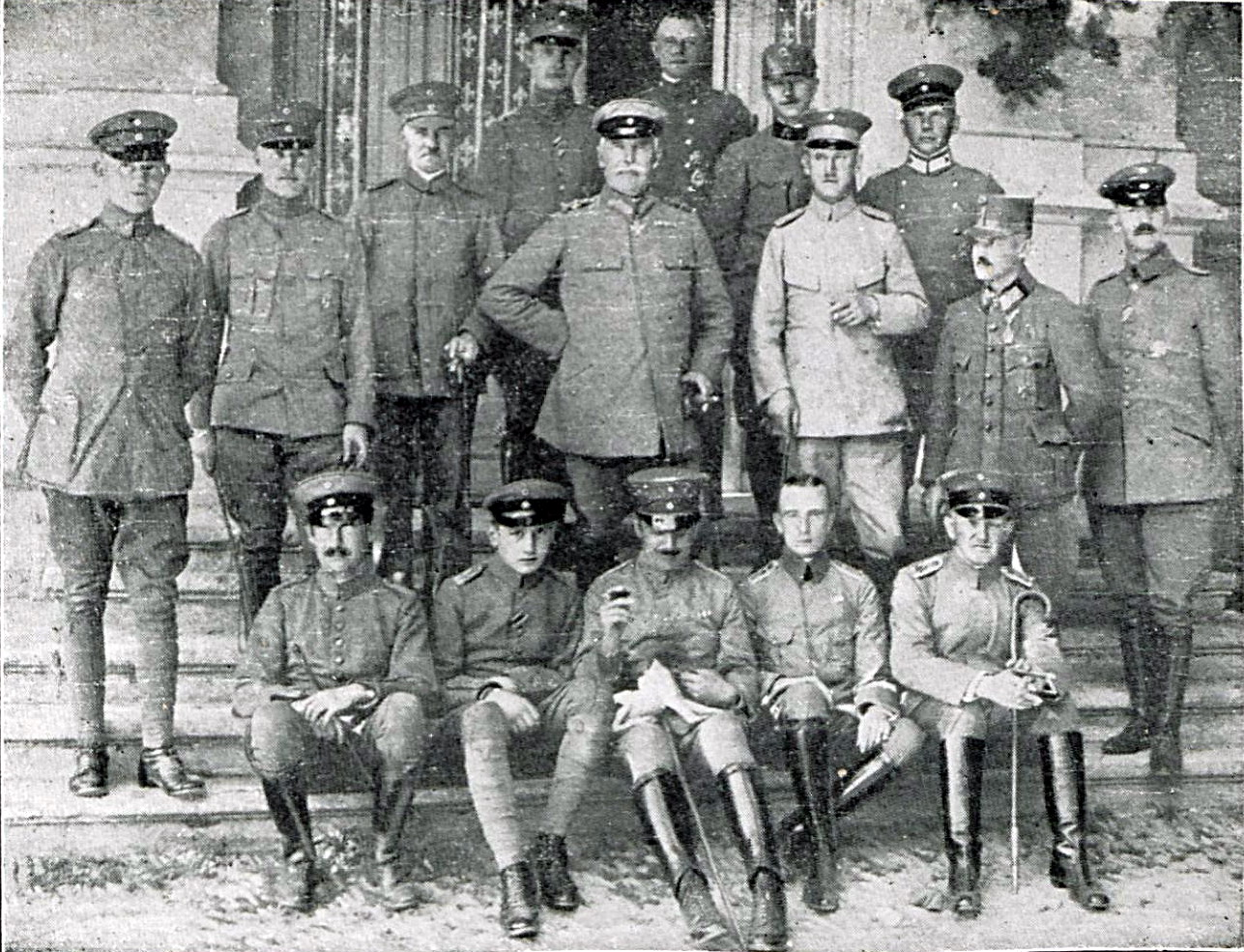
von Eben with the general staff of the 9th Army in Romania

With the outbreak of World War I in August 1914, von Eben's 30th Division, under the XV Army Corps, participated in battles in Lorraine. His leadership earned him promotion to general of the infantry on 2 September 1914. He was transferred to command the X Reserve Corps after General Günther von Kirchbach had been wounded. The Corps fought in the Battle of the Marne, and was part of the right wing of the Second Army.

On 11 June 1915, von Eben took over the I Army Corps in East Prussia under the 12th Army. In July he succeeded in taking the Fortress Ostrołęka and in August besieged and occupied Białystok. In September 1915, attached to the 10th Army, besieged and occupied the city of Vilnius, and in October, Daugavpils with Army Group Scholz.

During the Russian Brusilov Offensive of June 1916, General von Eben and his command was subordinated to the 2nd Austrian Army in the Carpathians. They were successful in averting a Russian break through to Hungary during the defensive battles in September.

On 7 October 1916, General von Eben was awarded the Pour le Mérite during a visit to the front by Kaiser Wilhelm II. The award had been proposed by General Erich Ludendorff. Von Eben received command of the 9th Army in Romania, succeeding Robert Kosch on 10 June 1917. Field Marshal August von Mackensen proposed von Eben for the Oak Leaves to the Pour le Mérite, which was conferred on 22 September 1917. After the separate Peace of Bucharest, which Romania concluded with the Central Powers in December 1917, the 9th Army moved to France on the Western Front. Von Eben took over command of Army Detachment A in Alsace. From 18 June 1918 he also took command of the 9th Army, until the seriously ill Fritz von Below was able to take this position. After the Armistice in November 1918, von Eben took the troops under his command back over the Rhine River to Württemberg.

After the War, von Eben, staying in the military, was given the duties of commanding general of the First Army Corps in Königsberg on 14 December 1918. On 14 February 1919 Johannes von Eben submitted his resignation, which was accepted, ending his military career.

== Later life ==
Johannes von Eben retired to his native estate at Bauditten, in East Prussia, where he died on 30 June 1924 at the age of 69.

== Awards ==
- Pour le Mérite with Oak Leaves
- The Order of the Red Eagle IV. Class with oak
- Order of the Crown (Prussia)
- Order of Saints Maurice and Lazarus
- Order of the Württemberg Crown

== Literature ==
- Hasso von Benda: General of Infantry Johannes von Eben. In: German soldiers Yearbook 1980. shield Munich 1980. ISBN 3-88014-073-1.
- Karl-Friedrich Hildebrand, Christian Zweng: The Knight of the Order Pour le Mérite the First World War. Volume 1:. AG Biblio, Osnabrück 1999, ISBN 3-7648-2505-7, pp 332–334.
- Hanns Möller:. History of the Knights of the Order Pour le Mérite in World War Volume I: AL. Bernard & Graefe, Berlin 1935, pp 247–248.
- Harry Rege:. Officer strain list of Infantry Regiment No. 76. Mauke. Hamburg 1902. OCLC 252978009 Number 97. P. 79-80.

Military offices
Preceded by General der Infanterie Robert Kosch	Commander, 9th Army; 10 June 1917 – 9 June 1918	Succeeded by General der Infanterie Fritz von Below
Preceded by General der Infanterie Bruno von Mudra	Commander, Armee-Abteilung A 6 August 1918 – 20 December 1918	Succeeded by Dissolved
