= Kurashim =

Kurashim Курашим
- Selo
- Location within Perm Krai Location within Russia
- Coordinates: 57°39′N 56°36′E
- Country: Russia
- Region: Perm Krai
- District: Permsky District
- Time zone: UTC+5:00

Kurashim (Russian: Курашим) is a rural locality (a selo) in Kukushtanskoye Rural Settlement, Permsky District, Perm Krai, Russia. The population was 2,513 as of 2010. There are 32 streets.

== Geography ==
Kurashim is located on the Kurashimovka River, 58 km southeast of Perm (the district's administrative centre) by road. Platoshino is the nearest rural locality.
