= Sukhobizyarka =

Sukhobizyarka Сухобизярка
- Settlement
- Location within Perm Krai Location within Russia
- Coordinates: 57°31′N 56°05′E
- Country: Russia
- Region: Perm Krai
- District: Permsky District
- Time zone: UTC+5:00

Sukhobizyarka (Russian: Сухобизярка) is a rural locality (a settlement) in Palnikovskoye Rural Settlement, Permsky District, Perm Krai, Russia. The population was 199 as of 2010. There are 6 streets.

== Geography ==
Sukhobizyarka is located 76 km south of Perm (the district's administrative centre) by road. Bizyar is the nearest rural locality.
