= Kanabekovo =

Kanabekovo Канабеково
- Village
- Location within Perm Krai Location within Russia
- Coordinates: 57°56′N 56°38′E
- Country: Russia
- Region: Perm Krai
- District: Permsky District
- Time zone: UTC+5:00

Kanabekovo (Russian: Канабеково) is a rural locality (a village) in Frolovskoye Rural Settlement, Permsky District, Perm Krai, Russia. The population was 9 as of 2010. There are 2 streets.

== Geography ==
Kanabekovo is located 33 km southeast of Perm (the district's administrative centre) by road. Molokovo is the nearest rural locality.
