= Mulyanka (settlement) =

Mulyanka Мулянка
- Settlement
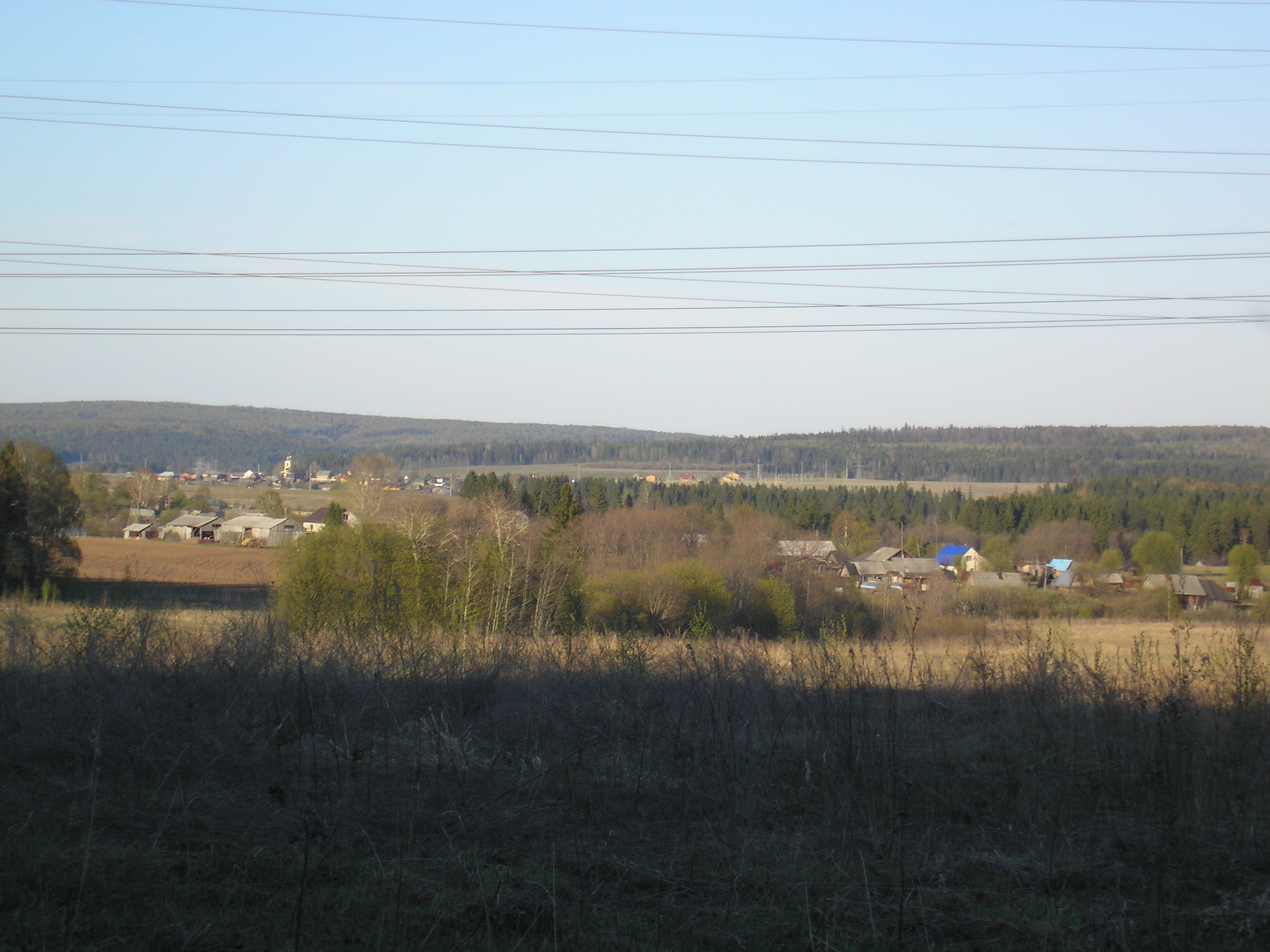

- Location within Perm Krai Location within Russia
- Coordinates: 57°48′N 56°22′E
- Country: Russia
- Region: Perm Krai
- District: Permsky District
- Time zone: UTC+5:00

Mulyanka (Russian: Мулянка) is a rural locality (a settlement) in Lobanovskoye Rural Settlement, Permsky District, Perm Krai, Russia. The population was 2,451 as of 2010. There are 53 streets.

== Geography ==
Mulyanka is located 29 km south of Perm (the district's administrative centre) by road. Gribanovo is the nearest rural locality.
