= Gruzdi =

Gruzdi Грузди
- Village
- Location within Perm Krai Location within Russia
- Coordinates: 57°50′N 56°43′E
- Country: Russia
- Region: Perm Krai
- District: Permsky District
- Time zone: UTC+5:00

Gruzdi (Russian: Грузди) is a rural locality (a village) in Dvurechenskoye Rural Settlement, Permsky District, Perm Krai, Russia. The population was 11 as of 2010. There are 19 streets.

== Geography ==
Gruzdi is located 48 km southeast of Perm (the district's administrative centre) by road. Staroverovo is the nearest rural locality.
