= Krasny Voskhod =

Krasny Voskhod Красный Восход
- Settlement
- Location within Perm Krai Location within Russia
- Coordinates: 57°59′N 55°42′E
- Country: Russia
- Region: Perm Krai
- District: Permsky District
- Time zone: UTC+5:00

Krasny Voskhod (Russian: Красный Восход) is a rural locality (a settlement) in Ust-Kachkinskoye Rural Settlement, Permsky District, Perm Krai, Russia. The population was 1,364 as of 2010. There are 42 streets.

== Geography ==
Krasny Voskhod is located 47 km west of Perm (the district's administrative centre) by road. Ust-Kachka is the nearest rural locality.
