= Yasyri =

Yasyri Ясыри
- Village
- Location within Perm Krai Location within Russia
- Coordinates: 57°56′N 56°02′E
- Country: Russia
- Region: Perm Krai
- District: Permsky District
- Time zone: UTC+5:00

Yasyri (Russian: Ясыри) is a rural locality (a village) in Savinskoye Rural Settlement, Permsky District, Perm Krai, Russia. The population was 360 as of 2010. There are 7 streets.

== Geography ==
Yasyri is located 17 km southwest of Perm (the district's administrative centre) by road. Vanyuki is the nearest rural locality.
