= Gamy =

Gamy Гамы
- Village
- Location within Perm Krai Location within Russia
- Coordinates: 58°01′N 55°47′E
- Country: Russia
- Region: Perm Krai
- District: Permsky District
- Time zone: UTC+5:00

Gamy (Russian: Гамы) is a rural locality (a village) in Ust-Kachkinskoye Rural Settlement, Permsky District, Perm Krai, Russia. The population was 344 as of 2010. There are 17 streets.

== Geography ==
Gamy is located 53 km west of Perm (the district's administrative centre) by road. Kachka is the nearest rural locality.
