= Rassolnaya =

Rassolnaya Рассольная
- Village
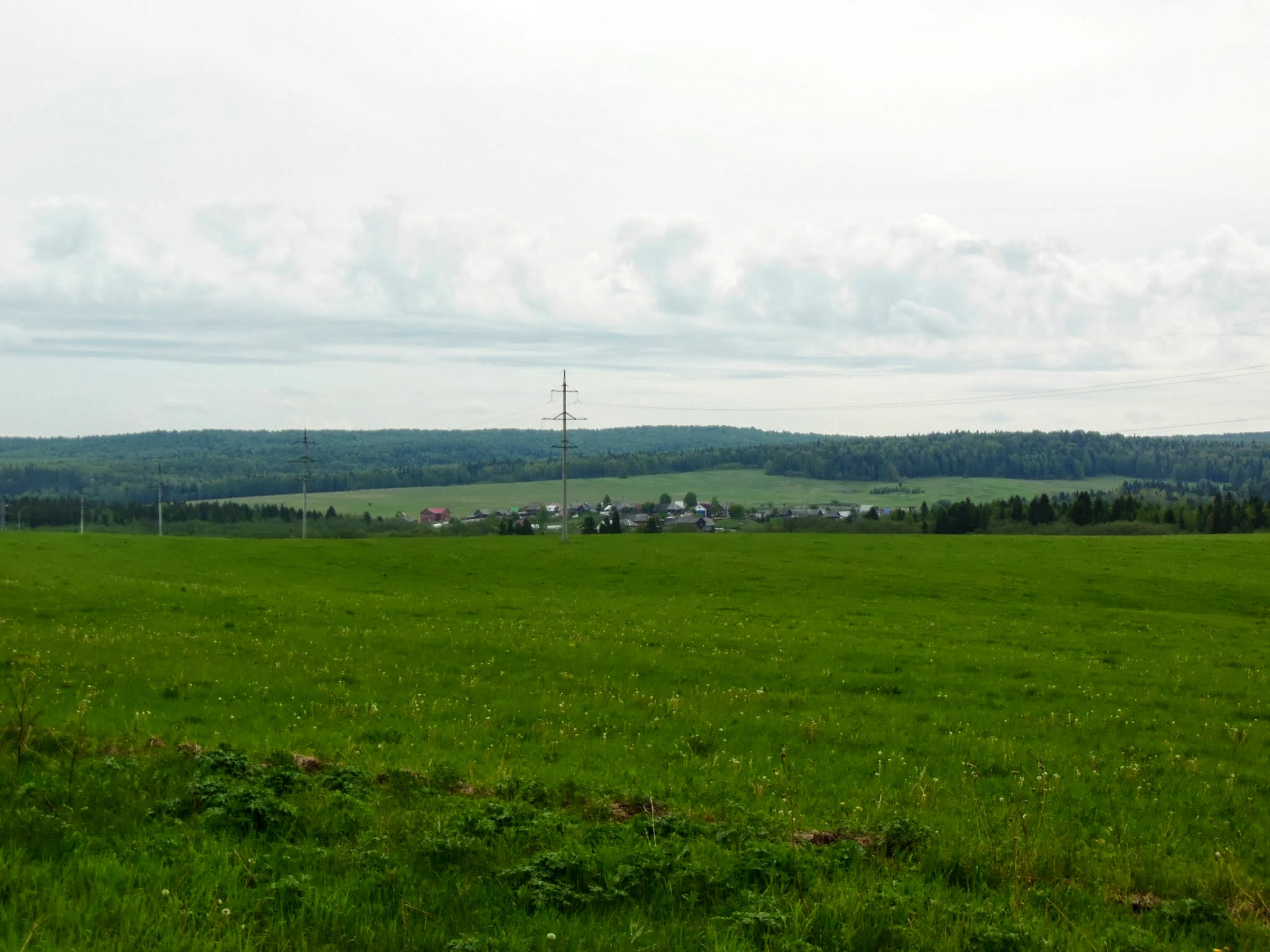

- Location within Perm Krai Location within Russia
- Coordinates: 57°48′N 56°34′E
- Country: Russia
- Region: Perm Krai
- District: Permsky District
- Time zone: UTC+5:00

Rassolnaya (Russian: Рассольная) is a rural locality (a village) in Dvurechenskoye Rural Settlement, Permsky District, Perm Krai, Russia. The population was 29 as of 2010. There are 3 streets.

== Geography ==
Rassolnaya is located 38 km southeast of Perm (the district's administrative centre) by road. Verkhnyaya Rassolnaya is the nearest rural locality.
