= Verkhnyaya Rassolnaya =

Verkhnyaya Rassolnaya Верхняя Рассольная
- Village
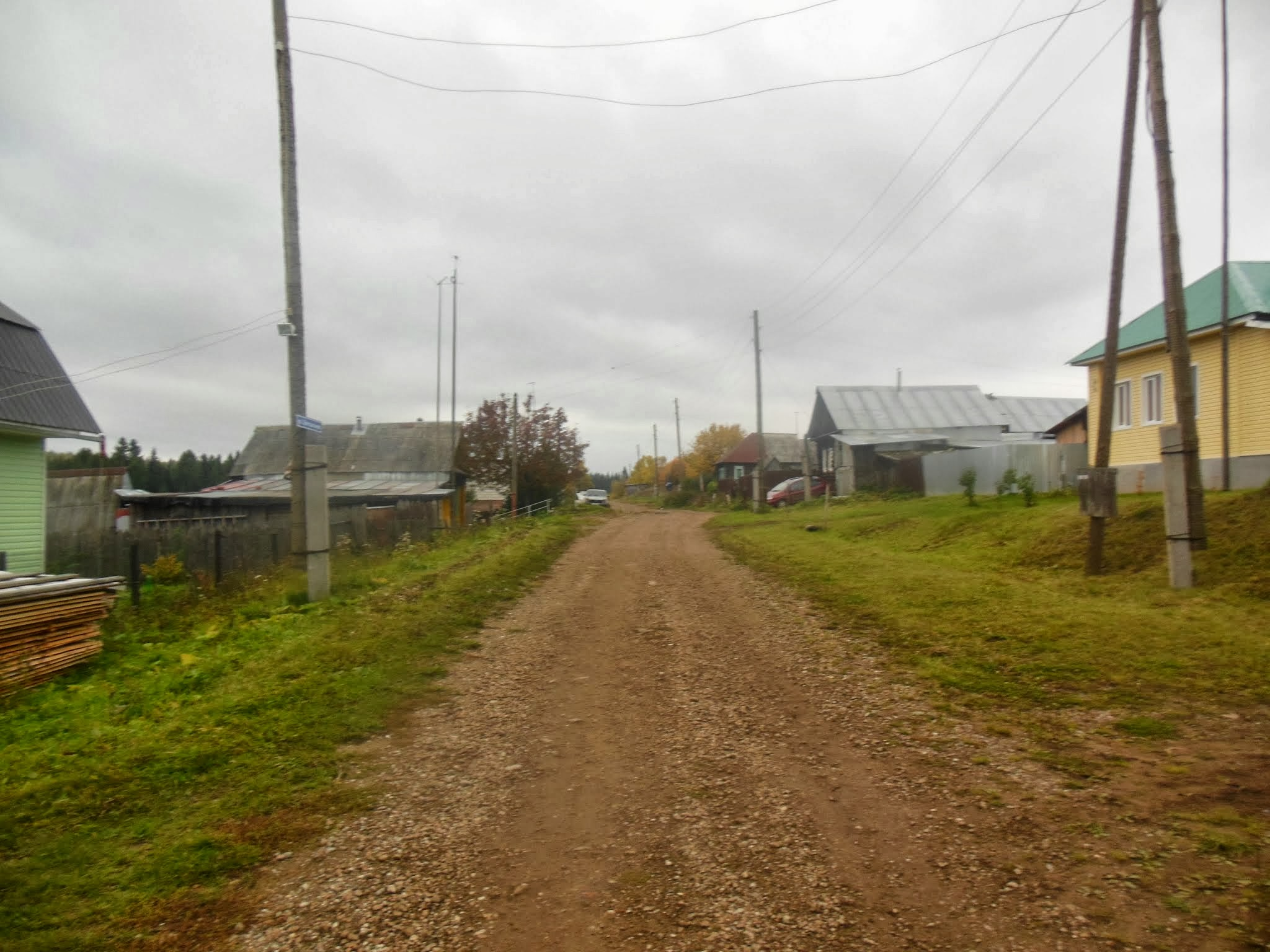

- Location within Perm Krai Location within Russia
- Coordinates: 57°47′N 56°35′E
- Country: Russia
- Region: Perm Krai
- District: Permsky District
- Time zone: UTC+5:00

Verkhnyaya Rassolnaya (Russian: Верхняя Рассольная) is a rural locality (a village) in Dvurechenskoye Rural Settlement, Permsky District, Perm Krai, Russia. The population was 15 as of 2010. There is 1 street.

== Geography ==
Verkhnyaya Rassolnaya is located 40 km southeast of Perm (the district's administrative centre) by road. Rassolnaya is the nearest rural locality.
