= Kashino =

Kashino Кашино
- Village
- Location within Perm Krai Location within Russia
- Coordinates: 57°33′N 55°44′E
- Country: Russia
- Region: Perm Krai
- District: Permsky District
- Time zone: UTC+5:00

Kashino (Russian: Кашино) is a rural locality (a village) in Yugo-Kamskoye Rural Settlement, Permsky District, Perm Krai, Russia. The population was 4 as of 2010. There are 2 streets.

== Geography ==
Kashino is located 78 km southwest of Perm (the district's administrative centre) by road. Rozhdestvenskoye is the nearest rural locality.
