= Russkoye Pole =

Russkoye Pole Русское Поле
- Khutor
- Location within Perm Krai Location within Russia
- Coordinates: 57°57′N 56°39′E
- Country: Russia
- Region: Perm Krai
- District: Permsky District
- Time zone: UTC+5:00

Russkoye Pole (Russian: Русское Поле) is a rural locality (a khutor) in Frolovskoye Rural Settlement, Permsky District, Perm Krai, Russia. The population was 1 as of 2010. There are 4 streets.

== Geography ==
Russkoye Pole is located 36 km southeast of Perm (the district's administrative centre) by road. Kanabekovo is the nearest rural locality.
