= Ust-Pizya =

Ust-Pizya Усть-Пизя
- Settlement
- Location within Perm Krai Location within Russia
- Coordinates: 57°30′N 55°35′E
- Country: Russia
- Region: Perm Krai
- District: Permsky District
- Time zone: UTC+5:00

Ust-Pizya (Russian: Усть-Пизя) is a rural locality (a settlement) in Yugo-Kamskoye Rural Settlement, Permsky District, Perm Krai, Russia. The population was 266 as of 2010. There are 11 streets.

== Geography ==
Ust-Pizya is located 84 km southwest of Perm (the district's administrative centre) by road. Shondikha is the nearest rural locality.
