= Maly Burtym =

Maly Burtym Малый Буртым
- Village
- Location within Perm Krai Location within Russia
- Coordinates: 57°49′N 56°21′E
- Country: Russia
- Region: Perm Krai
- District: Permsky District
- Time zone: UTC+5:00

Maly Burtym (Russian: Малый Буртым) is a rural locality (a village) in Lobanovskoye Rural Settlement, Permsky District, Perm Krai, Russia. The population was 78 as of 2010. There are 9 streets.

== Geography ==
Maly Burtym is located 26 km south of Perm (the district's administrative centre) by road. Balandino is the nearest rural locality.
