= Dikaya Gar =

Dikaya Gar Дикая Гарь
- Village
- Location within Perm Krai Location within Russia
- Coordinates: 57°49′N 55°58′E
- Country: Russia
- Region: Perm Krai
- District: Permsky District
- Time zone: UTC+5:00

Dikaya Gar (Russian: Дикая Гарь) is a rural locality (a village) in Kultayevskoye Rural Settlement, Permsky District, Perm Krai, Russia. The population was 103 as of 2010. There are 7 streets.

== Geography ==
Dikaya Gar is located 29 km southwest of Perm (the district's administrative centre) by road. Polyudovo is the nearest rural locality.
