= Poludennaya =

Poludennaya Полуденная
- Village
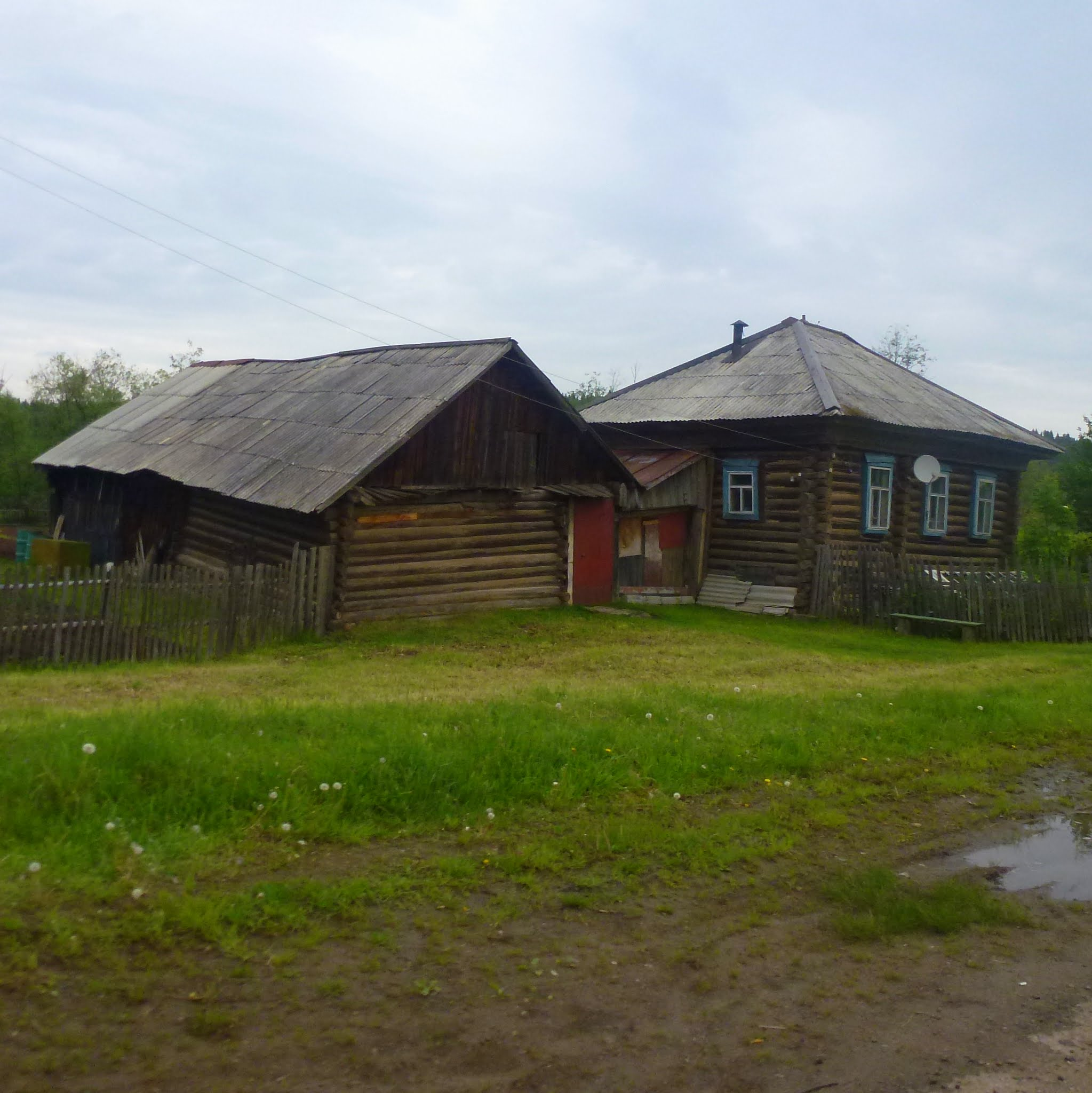
- Poludennaya

- Location within Perm Krai Location within Russia
- Coordinates: 57°43′N 55°38′E
- Country: Russia
- Region: Perm Krai
- District: Permsky District
- Time zone: UTC+5:00

Poludennaya (Russian: Полуденная) is a rural locality (a village) in Yugo-Kamskoye Rural Settlement, Permsky District, Perm Krai, Russia. The population was 68 as of 2010. There are 24 streets.

== Geography ==
Poludennaya is located 51 km southwest of Perm (the district's administrative centre) by road. Yugo-Kamsky is the nearest rural locality.
