= Sasiny, Warmian-Masurian Voivodeship =

Sasiny
- Village
- Location within Poland
- Coordinates: 53°56′51″N 19°37′04″E
- Country: Poland
- Voivodeship: Warmian-Masurian
- County: Ostróda
- Gmina: Małdyty

Sasiny [saˈɕinɨ] is a village in the administrative district of Gmina Małdyty, within Ostróda County, Warmian-Masurian Voivodeship, in northern Poland.
