= Wilamówko, Ostróda County =

Wilamówko
- Settlement
- Location within Poland
- Coordinates: 53°54′19″N 19°48′4″E
- Country: Poland
- Voivodeship: Warmian-Masurian
- County: Ostróda
- Gmina: Małdyty

Wilamówko [vilaˈmufkɔ] is a settlement in the administrative district of Gmina Małdyty, within Ostróda County, Warmian-Masurian Voivodeship, in northern Poland.
