= Ilya Berezin =

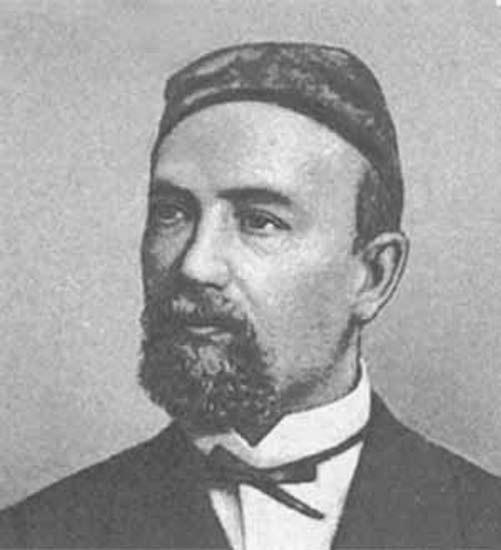
- Born: Илья Николаевич Березин; July 30, 1818; Yug, Permsky Uyezd, Perm Governorate, Russian Empire
- Died: April 3, 1896 (aged 77); Saint Petersburg, Russian Empire
- Occupations: Historian, philologist, Orientalist, pedagogue

Ilya Nikolayevich Berezin (Russian: Илья́ Никола́евич Бере́зин, 20 July 1818, Yug, Permsky Uyezd, Perm Governorate, Russian Empire — 3 April 1896, Saint Petersburg, Russian Empire) was a Russian Orientalist, the major authority on the culture, languages and history of Turkey, Iran and Mongolia, the Meritorious Professor of Saint Petersburg University, who wrote both in Russian and French.

Among his acclaimed works written in Russian were The Library of Oriental Historians (Библиотека восточных историков, 1850—1851, 2 volumes), Travelling the East (Путешествия по Востоку, 1849—1852, 2 volumes). The East Turkey Library (Библиотека восточных турков, 1849—1854, 3 volumes), The Turkish Reader (Турецкая хрестоматия, 1857—1878, 3 volumes). His French-language works include Recherches sur les dialectes persans (1853), Catalogue des mémoires et des médailles du cabinet numismatique de l’université de Casan (1855), Guide du voyageur en Orient. Dialogues arabes d’après trois principaux dialectes: de Mésopotamie, de Syrie et d'Egypte (1857). In 1872—1882 Ilya Berezin edited the Russian Encyclopedian Dictionary in 16 volumes.

He was the recipient of high-profile awards, including the Orders of St. Anna (1st class), St. Stanislaus (1st class) and St. Vladimir (3rd class).
