= Zagrishinskoye =

Zagrishinskoye Загришинское
- Village
- Location within Perm Krai Location within Russia
- Coordinates: 58°14′N 56°18′E
- Country: Russia
- Region: Perm Krai
- District: Permsky District
- Time zone: UTC+5:00

Zagrishinskoye (Russian: Загришинское) is a rural locality (a village) in Khokhlovskoye Rural Settlement, Permsky District, Perm Krai, Russia. The population was 28 as of 2010. There are 3 streets.

== Geography ==
Zagrishinskoye is located 42 km north of Perm (the district's administrative centre) by road. Skobelevka is the nearest rural locality.
