= Wielki Dwór =

- Village
- Location within Poland
- Coordinates: 53°55′N 19°37′E
- Country: Poland
- Voivodeship: Warmian-Masurian
- County: Ostróda
- Gmina: Małdyty

Wielki Dwór (Polish pronunciation: [ˈvjɛlkʲi ˈdvur]) is a village in the administrative district of Gmina Małdyty, within Ostróda County, Warmian-Masurian Voivodeship, in northern Poland.
