= Yug (settlement) =

Yug Юг
- Settlement
- Location within Perm Krai Location within Russia
- Coordinates: 57°43′N 56°10′E
- Country: Russia
- Region: Perm Krai
- District: Permsky District
- Time zone: UTC+5:00

Поселок Юг (Yug)

Yug (Russian: Юг) is a rural locality (a settlement) and the administrative center of Yugovskoye Rural Settlement, Permsky District, Perm Krai, Russia. The population was 2,687 as of 2010. There are 61 streets.

== Geography ==
Yug is located 39 km south of Perm (the district's administrative centre) by road. Zvyozdny is the nearest rural locality.

== Notable residents ==
- Ilya Berezin (1818—1896), Orientalist
- Fyodor Panayev (1856—1933), teacher and climatologist
