= Ględy, Gmina Małdyty =

Ględy
- Village
- Location within Poland
- Coordinates: 53°52′48″N 19°48′34″E
- Country: Poland
- Voivodeship: Warmian-Masurian
- County: Ostróda
- Gmina: Małdyty

Ględy [ˈɡlɛndɨ] (German Gallinden) is a village in the administrative district of Gmina Małdyty, within Ostróda County, Warmian-Masurian Voivodeship, in northern Poland.
