= Koszajny =

- Village
- Location within Poland
- Coordinates: 53°56′N 19°35′E
- Country: Poland
- Voivodeship: Warmian-Masurian
- County: Ostróda
- Gmina: Małdyty
- Time zone: UTC+1 (CET)
  - Summer (DST): UTC+2 (CEST)
- Vehicle registration: NOS

Koszajny [kɔˈʂai̯nɨ] is a village in the administrative district of Gmina Małdyty, within Ostróda County, Warmian-Masurian Voivodeship, in northern Poland.

In November 1831, several Polish infantry units of the November Uprising stopped in the village on the way to their internment places.
