= Fiugajki, Gmina Małdyty =

Fiugajki
- Village
- Location within Poland
- Coordinates: 53°53′48″N 19°41′44″E
- Country: Poland
- Voivodeship: Warmian-Masurian
- County: Ostróda
- Gmina: Małdyty

Fiugajki [fjuˈɡai̯ki] (German Figaiken) is a village in the administrative district of Gmina Małdyty, within Ostróda County, Warmian-Masurian Voivodeship, in northern Poland.
