= Kreki =

- Village
- Location within Poland
- Coordinates: 53°55′43″N 19°35′44″E
- Country: Poland
- Voivodeship: Warmian-Masurian
- County: Ostróda
- Gmina: Małdyty
- Population: 160

Kreki [ˈkrɛki] is a village in the administrative district of Gmina Małdyty, within Ostróda County, Warmian-Masurian Voivodeship, in northern Poland.
