= Sambród Mały =

- Village
- Location within Poland
- Coordinates: 53°57′1″N 19°43′50″E
- Country: Poland
- Voivodeship: Warmian-Masurian
- County: Ostróda
- Gmina: Małdyty

Sambród Mały [ˈsambrut ˈmawɨ] is a village in the administrative district of Gmina Małdyty, within Ostróda County, Warmian-Masurian Voivodeship, in northern Poland.
