= Zajezierze, Warmian-Masurian Voivodeship =

Zajezierze
- Village
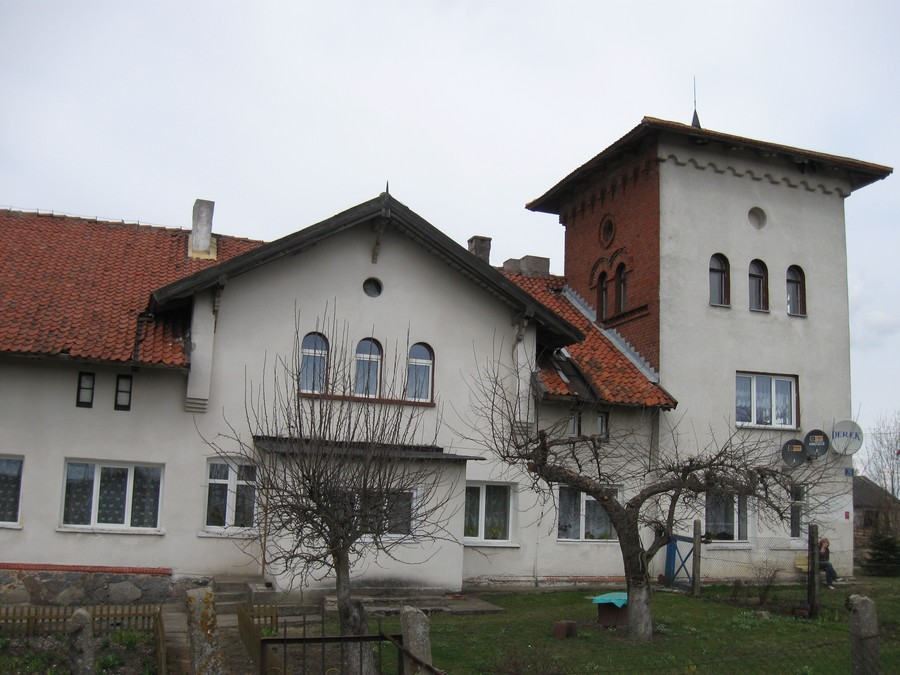

- Location within Poland
- Coordinates: 53°54′N 19°43′E
- Country: Poland
- Voivodeship: Warmian-Masurian
- County: Ostróda
- Gmina: Małdyty

Zajezierze [zajɛˈʑɛʐɛ] (German Seegertswalde) is a village in the administrative district of Gmina Małdyty, within Ostróda County, Warmian-Masurian Voivodeship, in northern Poland.
