= Klonowy Dwór =

- Village
- Location within Poland
- Coordinates: 53°51′44″N 19°43′42″E
- Country: Poland
- Voivodeship: Warmian-Masurian
- County: Ostróda
- Gmina: Małdyty
- Population: 180

Klonowy Dwór [klɔˈnɔvɨ ˈdvur] is a village in the administrative district of Gmina Małdyty, within Ostróda County, Warmian-Masurian Voivodeship, in northern Poland.
