= Karczemka, Warmian-Masurian Voivodeship =

Karczemka
- Village
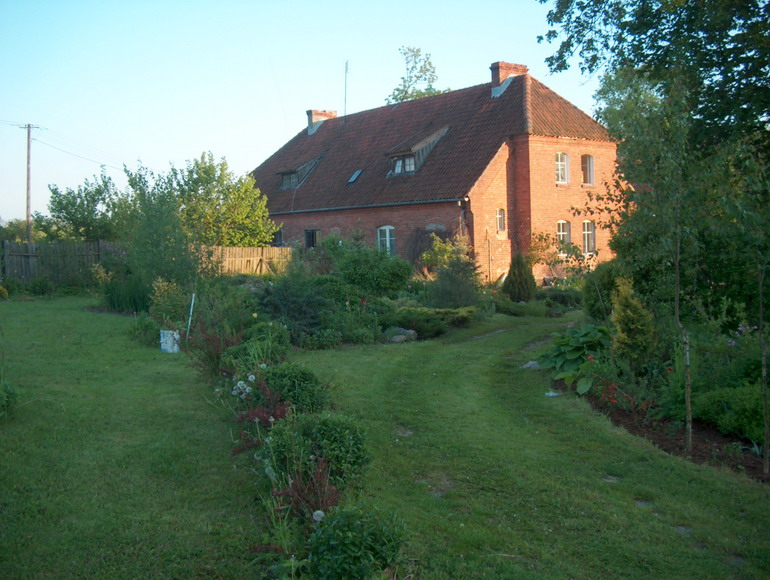

- Location within Poland
- Coordinates: 53°56′38″N 19°41′43″E
- Country: Poland
- Voivodeship: Warmian-Masurian
- County: Ostróda
- Gmina: Małdyty
- Population: 30

Karczemka [karˈt͡ʂɛmka] is a village in the administrative district of Gmina Małdyty, within Ostróda County, Warmian-Masurian Voivodeship, in northern Poland.
