= Ogryzko =

Ogryzko (Russian: Огры́зко) is a Russian last name, a variant of Ogryzkov. The following people bear this last name:

- Tatiana Ogrizko (Tatyana Ogryzko) (b. 1976), Belarusian Olympic rhythmic gymnast
- Vasily Ogryzko, scientist with the first publication on the alternative theories of quantum evolution
