= Drynki =

- Village
- Location within Poland
- Coordinates: 53°52′49″N 19°41′49″E
- Country: Poland
- Voivodeship: Warmian-Masurian
- County: Ostróda
- Gmina: Małdyty

Drynki [ˈdrɨnki] (German Drenken) is a village in the administrative district of Gmina Małdyty, within Ostróda County, Warmian-Masurian Voivodeship, in northern Poland.
