= Wilamowo, Ostróda County =

Wilamowo
- Village
- Location within Poland
- Coordinates: 53°54′N 19°46′E
- Country: Poland
- Voivodeship: Warmian-Masurian
- County: Ostróda
- Gmina: Małdyty

Wilamowo [vilaˈmɔvɔ] is a village in the administrative district of Gmina Małdyty, within Ostróda County, Warmian-Masurian Voivodeship, in northern Poland. The village is located near Lake Ruda Woda, offering scenic views and opportunities for outdoor activities such as fishing and boating.
