= Wodziany =

- Village
- Location within Poland
- Coordinates: 53°51′N 19°46′E
- Country: Poland
- Voivodeship: Warmian-Masurian
- County: Ostróda
- Gmina: Małdyty

Wodziany [vɔˈd͡ʑanɨ] (German Wodigehnen) is a village in the administrative district of Gmina Małdyty, within Ostróda County, Warmian-Masurian Voivodeship, in northern Poland.
