= Jarnołtowo =

- Village
- Location within Poland
- Coordinates: 53°53′48″N 19°39′02″E
- Country: Poland
- Voivodeship: Warmian-Masurian
- County: Ostróda
- Gmina: Małdyty

Jarnołtowo [jarnɔu̯ˈtɔvɔ] (German: Groß-Arnsdorf) is a village in the administrative district of Gmina Małdyty, within Ostróda County, Warmian-Masurian Voivodeship, in northern Poland.

It was established around 1308 and first mentioned in 1317 as Arnoldisdorff. In 1329–1335 the church was built. Between 1750 and 1754 Immanuel Kant, a philosopher, worked here as a tutor.

== Notable residents ==
German philosopher Immanuel Kant worked as a tutor in Groß-Arnsdorf between 1750 and 1754.
