= Ogryzkovo, Permsky District, Perm Krai =

Ogryzkovo Огрызково
- Village
- Location within Perm Krai Location within Russia
- Coordinates: 57°55′N 56°20′E
- Country: Russia
- Region: Perm Krai
- District: Permsky District
- Time zone: UTC+5:00

Ogryzkovo (Russian: Огрызково) is a rural locality (a village) in Frolovskoye Rural Settlement, Permsky District, Perm Krai, Russia. The population was 3 as of 2010. There are 3 streets.

== Geography ==
Ogryzkovo is located 16 km southeast of Perm (the district's administrative centre) by road. Kostryata is the nearest rural locality.
