= Niedźwiada, Warmian-Masurian Voivodeship =

Niedźwiada
- Village
- Location within Poland
- Coordinates: 53°56′23″N 19°37′50″E
- Country: Poland
- Voivodeship: Warmian-Masurian
- County: Ostróda
- Gmina: Małdyty

Niedźwiada [ɲɛd͡ʑˈvjada] is a village in the administrative district of Gmina Małdyty, within Ostróda County, Warmian-Masurian Voivodeship, in northern Poland.
