= Gumniska Małe =

- Village
- Location within Poland
- Coordinates: 53°55′29″N 19°40′52″E
- Country: Poland
- Voivodeship: Warmian-Masurian
- County: Ostróda
- Gmina: Małdyty

Gumniska Małe [ɡumˈniska ˈmawɛ] is a village in the administrative district of Gmina Małdyty, within Ostróda County, Warmian-Masurian Voivodeship, in northern Poland.
