= Zduny, Warmian-Masurian Voivodeship =

Zduny
- Village
- Location within Poland
- Coordinates: 53°57′54″N 19°45′31″E
- Country: Poland
- Voivodeship: Warmian-Masurian
- County: Ostróda
- Gmina: Małdyty

Zduny [ˈzdunɨ] is a village in the administrative district of Gmina Małdyty, within Ostróda County, Warmian-Masurian Voivodeship, in northern Poland.
