= Naświty =

- Village
- Location within Poland
- Coordinates: 53°53′N 19°49′E
- Country: Poland
- Voivodeship: Warmian-Masurian
- County: Ostróda
- Gmina: Małdyty

Naświty [naɕˈfitɨ] is a village in the administrative district of Gmina Małdyty, within Ostróda County, Warmian-Masurian Voivodeship, in northern Poland.

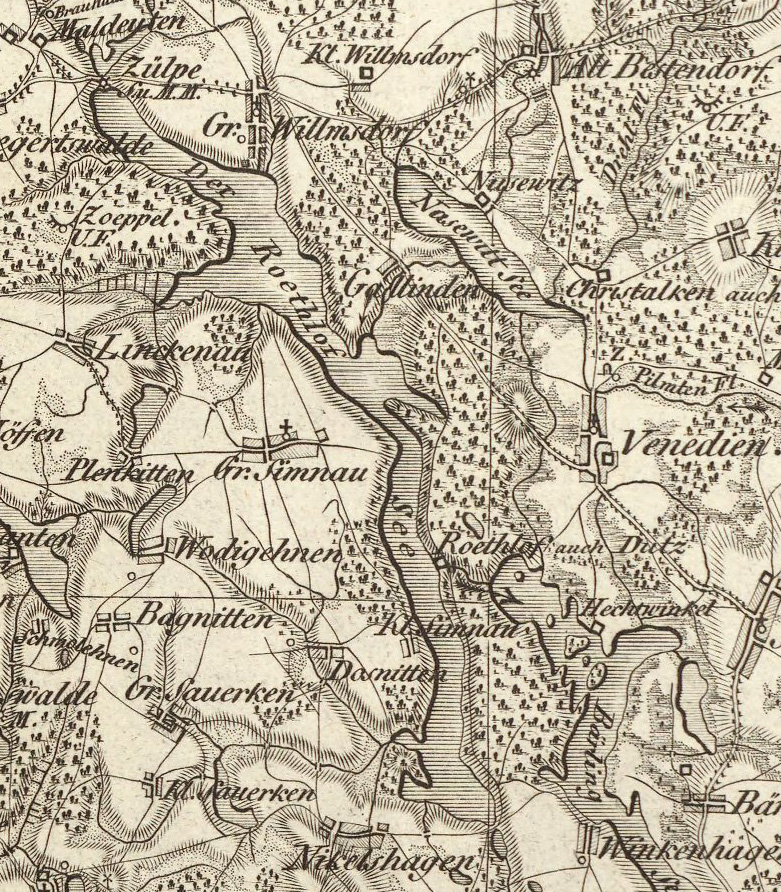
Now non-existent Lake Naświty on the 1802 map by Friedrich Leopold von Schrötter

Until the 19th century, the village was located by Lake Naświty (German: Nasewittsee), which was connected by the Drela River to Lake Ruda Woda. As a result of the construction of the Elbląg Canal between 1844 and 1860, and the lowering of the water levels of lakes located between Lake Jeziorak and Lake Drużno, Lake Naświty completely dried up.
