= Gmina Małdyty =

Gmina Małdyty Małdyty Commune
- Gmina
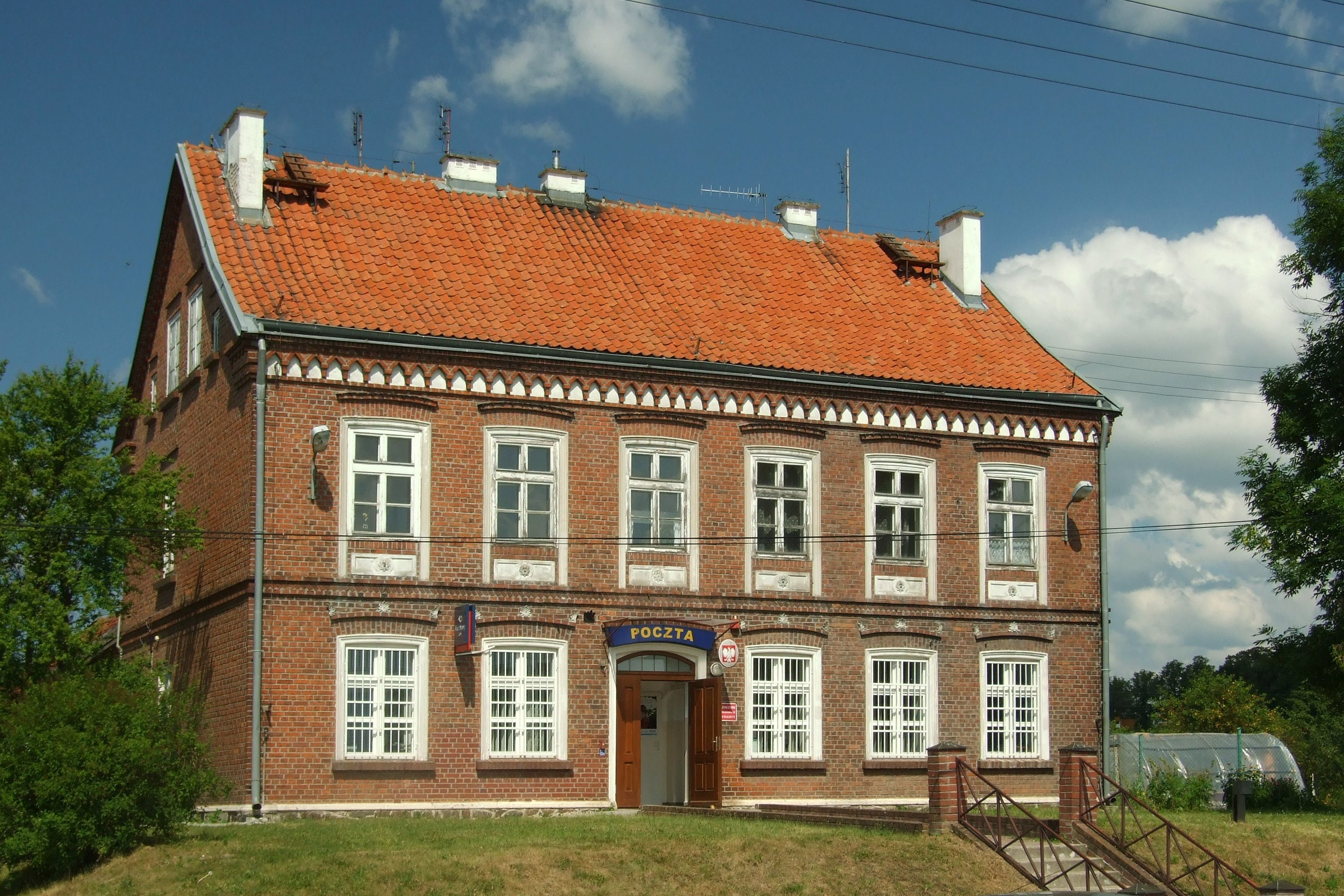

- Coat of arms
- Interactive map of Gmina Małdyty
- Coordinates (Małdyty): 53°55′11″N 19°44′44″E
- Country: Poland
- Voivodeship: Warmian-Masurian
- County: Ostróda
- Seat: Małdyty

Area
  - Total: 188.94 km^{2} (72.95 sq mi)

Population (2006)
  - Total: 6,281
  - Density: 33.24/km^{2} (86.10/sq mi)
- Website: http://www.maldyty.pl

Gmina Małdyty is a rural gmina (administrative district) in Ostróda County, Warmian-Masurian Voivodeship, in northern Poland. Its seat is the village of Małdyty, which lies approximately 29 kilometres (18 mi) north-west of Ostróda and 52 km (32 mi) west of the regional capital Olsztyn.

The gmina covers an area of 188.94 square kilometres (73.0 sq mi), and as of 2006 its total population is 6,281.

== Villages ==
Gmina Małdyty contains the villages and settlements of Bagnity, Bartno, Budwity, Budyty, Dobrocin, Drynki, Dziśnity, Ostróda County, Fiugajki, Gizajny, Ględy, Gumniska Małe, Gumniska Wielkie, Jarnołtówko, Jarnołtowo, Kadzie, Karczemka, Kęty, Kiełkuty, Klonowy Dwór, Koszajny, Kozia Wólka, Kreki, Leśnica, Leszczynka Mała, Linki, Małdyty, Naświty, Niedźwiada, Plękity, Pleśno, Połowite, Rybaki, Sambród, Sambród Mały, Sarna, Sasiny, Smolno, Sople, Surzyki Małe, Surzyki Wielkie, Szymonówko, Szymonowo, Wielki Dwór, Wilamówko, Wilamowo, Wodziany, Zajezierze, Zalesie and Zduny.

== Neighbouring gminas ==
Gmina Małdyty is bordered by the gminas of Miłomłyn, Morąg, Pasłęk, Rychliki, Stary Dzierzgoń and Zalewo.
