= Dziśnity, Ostróda County =

Dziśnity
- Village
- Location within Poland
- Coordinates: 53°50′18″N 19°47′10″E
- Country: Poland
- Voivodeship: Warmian-Masurian
- County: Ostróda
- Gmina: Małdyty
- Population: 180

Dziśnity [d͡ʑiɕˈnitɨ] is a village in the administrative district of Gmina Małdyty, within Ostróda County, Warmian-Masurian Voivodeship, in northern Poland.
