= Zaborye, Permsky District, Perm Krai =

Zaborye Заборье
- Village
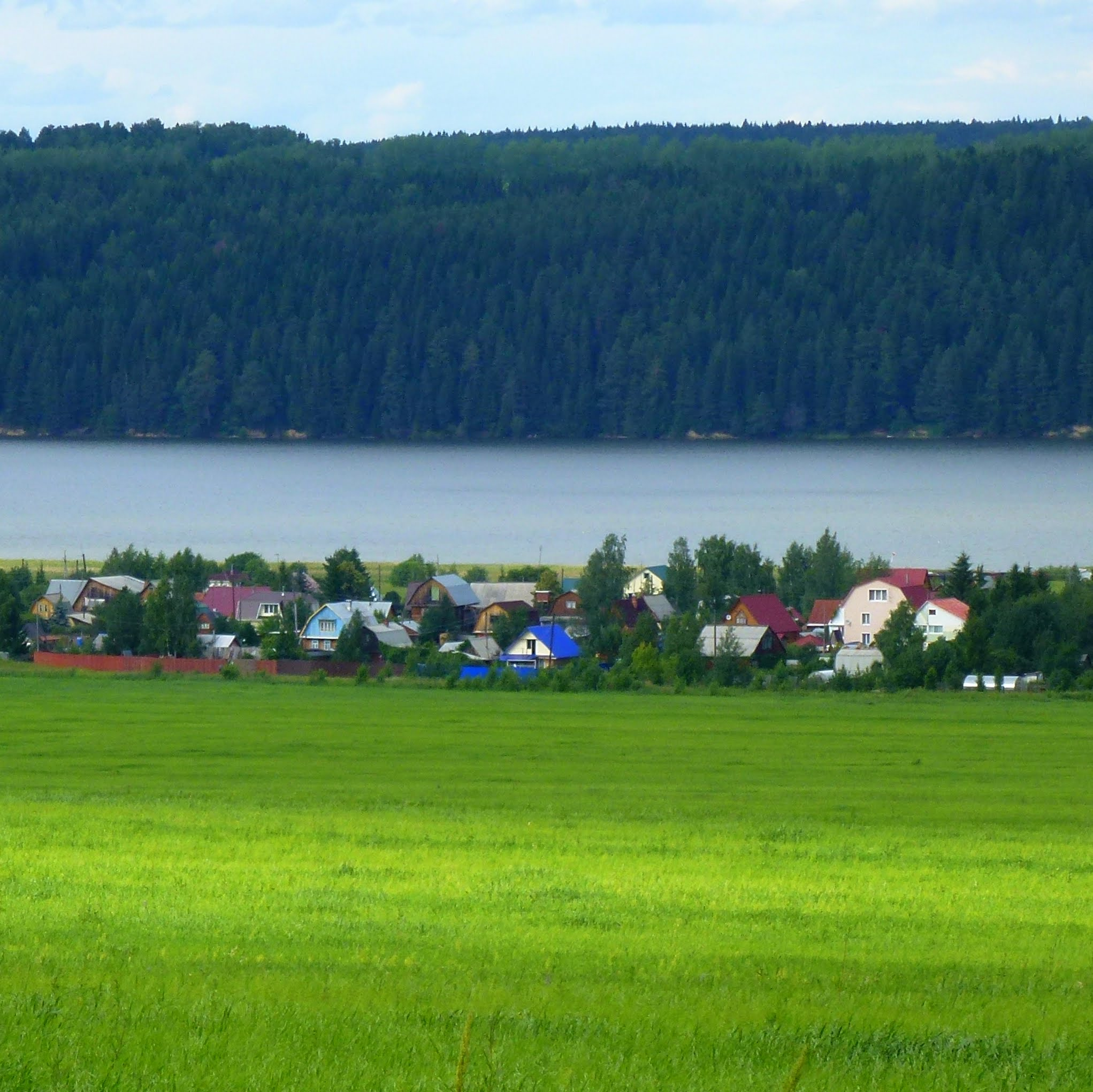

- Location within Perm Krai Location within Russia
- Coordinates: 57°50′N 56°47′E
- Country: Russia
- Region: Perm Krai
- District: Permsky District
- Time zone: UTC+5:00

Zaborye (Russian: Заборье) is a rural locality (a village) in Dvurechenskoye Rural Settlement, Permsky District, Perm Krai, Russia. The population was seven as of 2010. There are 41 streets.

== Geography ==
It is located 43 km south-east from Ferma.
