= Kozia Wólka =

- Settlement
- Location within Poland
- Coordinates: 53°55′17″N 19°51′21″E
- Country: Poland
- Voivodeship: Warmian-Masurian
- County: Ostróda
- Gmina: Małdyty

Kozia Wólka [ˈkɔʑa ˈvulka] is a settlement in the administrative district of Gmina Małdyty, within Ostróda County, Warmian-Masurian Voivodeship, in northern Poland.
