= Alebastrovo =

Alebastrovo Алебастрово
- Village
- Location within Perm Krai Location within Russia
- Coordinates: 58°02′N 56°49′E
- Country: Russia
- Region: Perm Krai
- District: Permsky District
- Time zone: UTC+5:00

Alebastrovo (Russian: Алебастрово) is a rural locality (a village) in Sylvenskoye Rural Settlement, Permsky District, Perm Krai, Russia. The population was 25 as of 2010. There are five streets.

== Geography ==
Alebastrovo is located 128 km east of Perm (the district's administrative centre) by road. Denisovo is the nearest rural locality.
