= Zalesie, Ostróda County =

Zalesie
- Village
- Location within Poland
- Coordinates: 53°56′22″N 19°45′40″E
- Country: Poland
- Voivodeship: Warmian-Masurian
- County: Ostróda
- Gmina: Małdyty

Zalesie [zaˈlɛɕɛ] is a village in the administrative district of Gmina Małdyty, within Ostróda County, Warmian-Masurian Voivodeship, in northern Poland.
