= Zavedeniye =

Zavedeniye Заведение
- Village
- Location within Perm Krai Location within Russia
- Coordinates: 58°01′N 56°40′E
- Country: Russia
- Region: Perm Krai
- District: Permsky District
- Time zone: UTC+5:00

Zavedeniye (Russian: Заведение) is a rural locality (a village) in Sylvenskoye Rural Settlement, Permsky District, Perm Krai, Russia. The population was 4 as of 2010.

== Geography ==
Zavedeniye is located 32 km east of Perm (the district's administrative centre) by road. Sylva is the nearest rural locality.
