= Leśnica, Warmian-Masurian Voivodeship =

Leśnica
- Village
- Location within Poland
- Coordinates: 53°56′N 19°45′E
- Country: Poland
- Voivodeship: Warmian-Masurian
- County: Ostróda
- Gmina: Małdyty

Leśnica [lɛɕˈnit͡sa] (German Freiwalde) is a village in the administrative district of Gmina Małdyty, within Ostróda County, Warmian-Masurian Voivodeship, in northern Poland.
