= Zaykovo =

Zaykovo Зайково
- Village
- Location within Perm Krai Location within Russia
- Coordinates: 57°39′N 56°30′E
- Country: Russia
- Region: Perm Krai
- District: Permsky District
- Time zone: UTC+5:00

Zaykovo (Russian: Зайково) is a rural locality (a village) in Kukushtanskoye Rural Settlement, Permsky District, Perm Krai, Russia. The population was 47 as of 2010.

== Geography ==
Zaykovo is located 52 km south of Perm (the district's administrative centre) by road. Kukushtan is the nearest rural locality.
