= Przezmark, Warmian-Masurian Voivodeship =

Przezmark
- Village
- Location within Poland
- Coordinates: 54°8′0″N 19°30′57″E
- Country: Poland
- Voivodeship: Warmian-Masurian
- County: Elbląg
- Gmina: Elbląg
- Population: 119

Przezmark [ˈpʂɛzmark] is a village in the administrative district of Gmina Elbląg, within Elbląg County, Warmian-Masurian Voivodeship, in northern Poland.

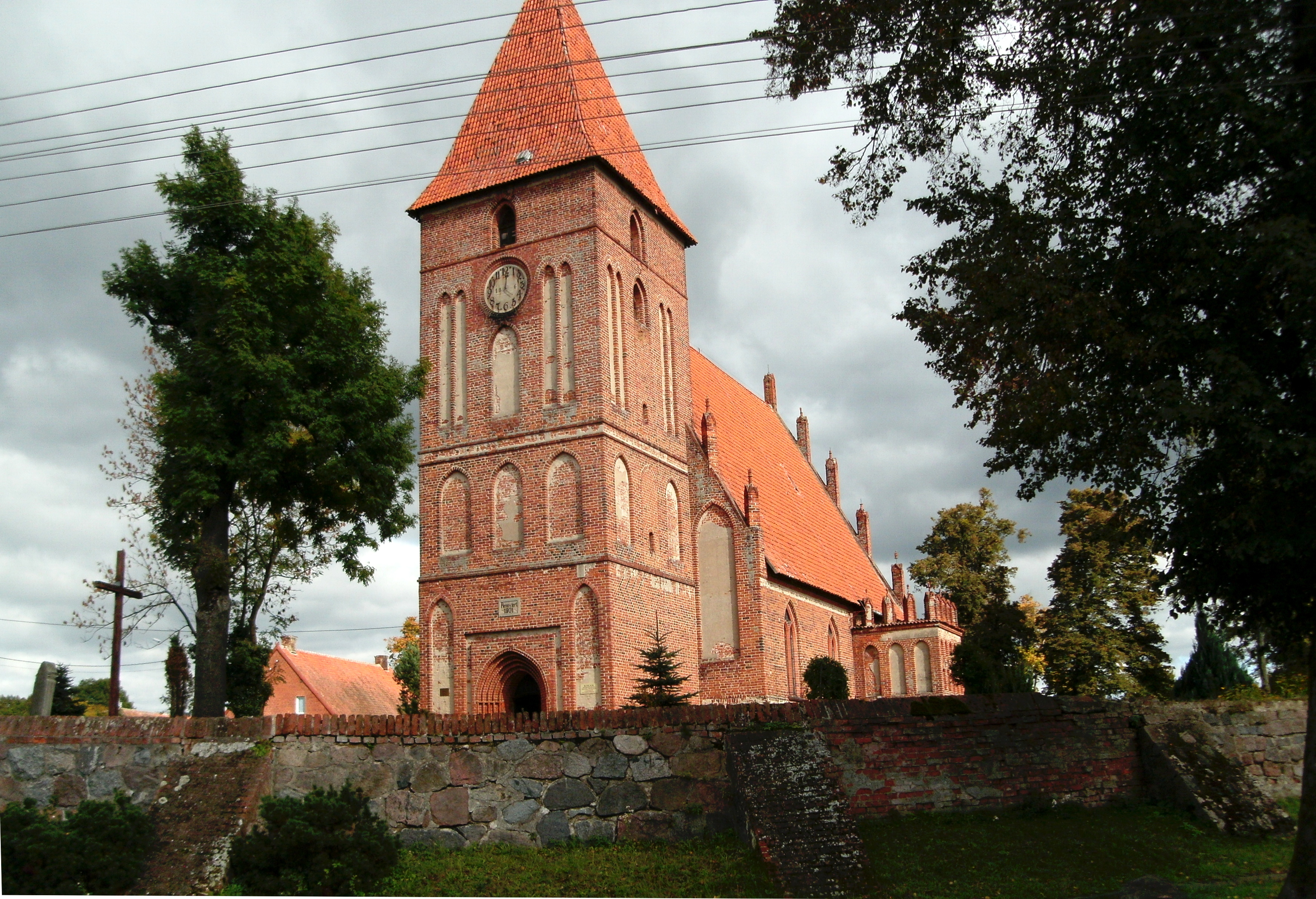
Village church of the Holy Cross

== Notable residents ==
- Johannes von Eben (1855–1924), Prussian General
