= Kety, Perm Krai =

Kety Кеты
- Village
- Location within Perm Krai Location within Russia
- Coordinates: 57°53′N 55°59′E
- Country: Russia
- Region: Perm Krai
- District: Permsky District
- Time zone: UTC+5:00

Kety (Russian: Кеты) is a rural locality (a village) in Kultayevskoye Rural Settlement, Permsky District, Perm Krai, Russia. The population was 17 as of 2010. There are 3 streets.

== Geography ==
Kety is located 21 km southwest of Perm (the district's administrative centre) by road. Kichanovo is the nearest rural locality.
