= Pleśno, Ostróda County =

Pleśno
- Village
- Location within Poland
- Coordinates: 53°52′34″N 19°42′42″E
- Country: Poland
- Voivodeship: Warmian-Masurian
- County: Ostróda
- Gmina: Małdyty
- Population: 30

Pleśno ([ˈplɛɕnɔ]; German: Plößen) is a village in the administrative district of Gmina Małdyty, within Ostróda County, Warmian-Masurian Voivodeship, in northern Poland.
