= Smolno, Warmian-Masurian Voivodeship =

Smolno
- Village
- Location within Poland
- Coordinates: 53°50′27″N 19°44′07″E
- Country: Poland
- Voivodeship: Warmian-Masurian
- County: Ostróda
- Gmina: Małdyty

Smolno ([ˈsmɔlnɔ]; German: Schmolehnen) is a village in the administrative district of Gmina Małdyty, within Ostróda County, Warmian-Masurian Voivodeship, in northern Poland.
