= Plękity =

- Village
- Location within Poland
- Coordinates: 53°51′36″N 19°45′25″E
- Country: Poland
- Voivodeship: Warmian-Masurian
- County: Ostróda
- Gmina: Małdyty
- Time zone: UTC+1 (CET)
  - Summer (DST): UTC+2 (CEST)
- Vehicle registration: NOS

Plękity [plɛnˈkitɨ] is a village in the administrative district of Gmina Małdyty, within Ostróda County, Warmian-Masurian Voivodeship, in northern Poland.

The Uzdowski Polish noble family lived in the village.
