= Szymonówko =

- Village
- Location within Poland
- Coordinates: 53°50′13″N 19°48′32″E
- Country: Poland
- Voivodeship: Warmian-Masurian
- County: Ostróda
- Gmina: Małdyty

Szymonówko (Polish: [ʂɨmɔˈnufkɔ]) is a village in the administrative district of Gmina Małdyty, within Ostróda County, Warmian-Masurian Voivodeship, in northern Poland. The village is located by Lake Ruda Woda and features a public pier that provides convenient access to the water.
