= Fyodor Panayev =

Fyodor Nikolayevich Panayev
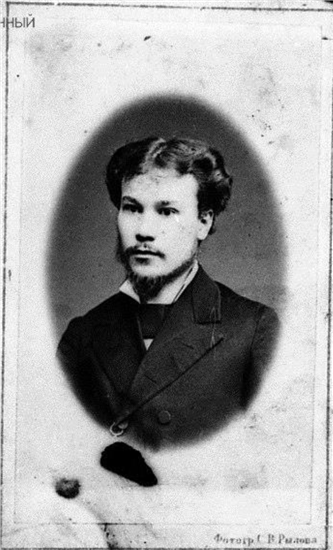
- Born: 1856; Yug, Permsky Uyezd, Perm Governorate, Russian Empire
- Died: 1933 (aged 76–77); Perm, Russian SFSR, Soviet Union
- Occupations: teacher, meteorologist
- Known for: study of local folklore, climatology, foundation of Perm Zoo

Fyodor Nikolayevich Panayev (Russian: Фёдор Никола́евич Пана́ев, 1856—1933) was a Russian teacher and climatologist, the author of a number of books on climatology and one of the founders of Perm Zoo.

Fyodor Panayev was born in 1856 in the settlement of Yug, in the Permsky Uyezd of the Perm Governorate of the Russian Empire. He graduated from Perm Uyezd College and worked as a teacher in Shadrinsk and in Solikamsk Parish College (1878—1891). In Solikamsk he studied the local folklore and published several papers in "Proceedings of Ural Society of natural science fans" (Russian: "Записки Уральского Общества Любителей Естествознания"). In 1883, his book "The anthology of proverbs, sayings, riddles, songs and epics, collected in Solikamsk Uyezd" (Russian: "Сборник пословиц, поговорок, загадок, песен и былин, собранных в Соликамском уезде") was published in Yekaterinburg. Since 1891 Panayev lived in Perm.

In the book "Brief geographical and physical essay on the city of Solikamsk" published in 1882, Panayev studied "Solikamsk Chronicle" and archive records of the middle of the 18th century about cruel frosts in Western Europe and made a conclusion about essential changing of climate in 18th—19th centuries:

The question of studying the climate of Ural region takes important nature. In desire to be closer to its solution we tried to collect information from old residents. It comes to the same thing: a change of climate has taken place, and the change was sharp. For example, old residents remember such severe and long winters some decades ago, that birds frozen in the air were a usual thing. The summer season was distinguished for strong heat, autumn and spring were short.

...

Abnormalities of seasons appear even nowadays, but, as for such terrible frosts, nobody except old residents remember them.

Since 1881 Panayev was a director of Perm Meteorological Station. It was an enclosed ground in the centre of city, where turrets with instruments were placed. Air temperature, humidity, pressure, wind velocity and direction, precipitation were measured there. Measurement results were sent to Chief Geophysical Observatory. On this results Panayev wrote several books on climatology. Panayev's climatological calendar and observation diaries are nowadays stored in Perm Krai Museum.

Panayev was one of the authors of "Illustrated guide-book on the Kama River and Vishera River with Kolva River" edited by Pavel Syuzev and published in 1911 by Printing-House of Perm Governorate Board.

In 1922 Panayev with zoologist S. L. Ushkov founded a nature study corner, which was reorganized to Perm Zoo in 1928.

Panayev died in 1933 and was buried at the Yegoshikha Cemetery.
