= Mokino, Permsky District, Perm Krai =

Mokino Мокино
- Village
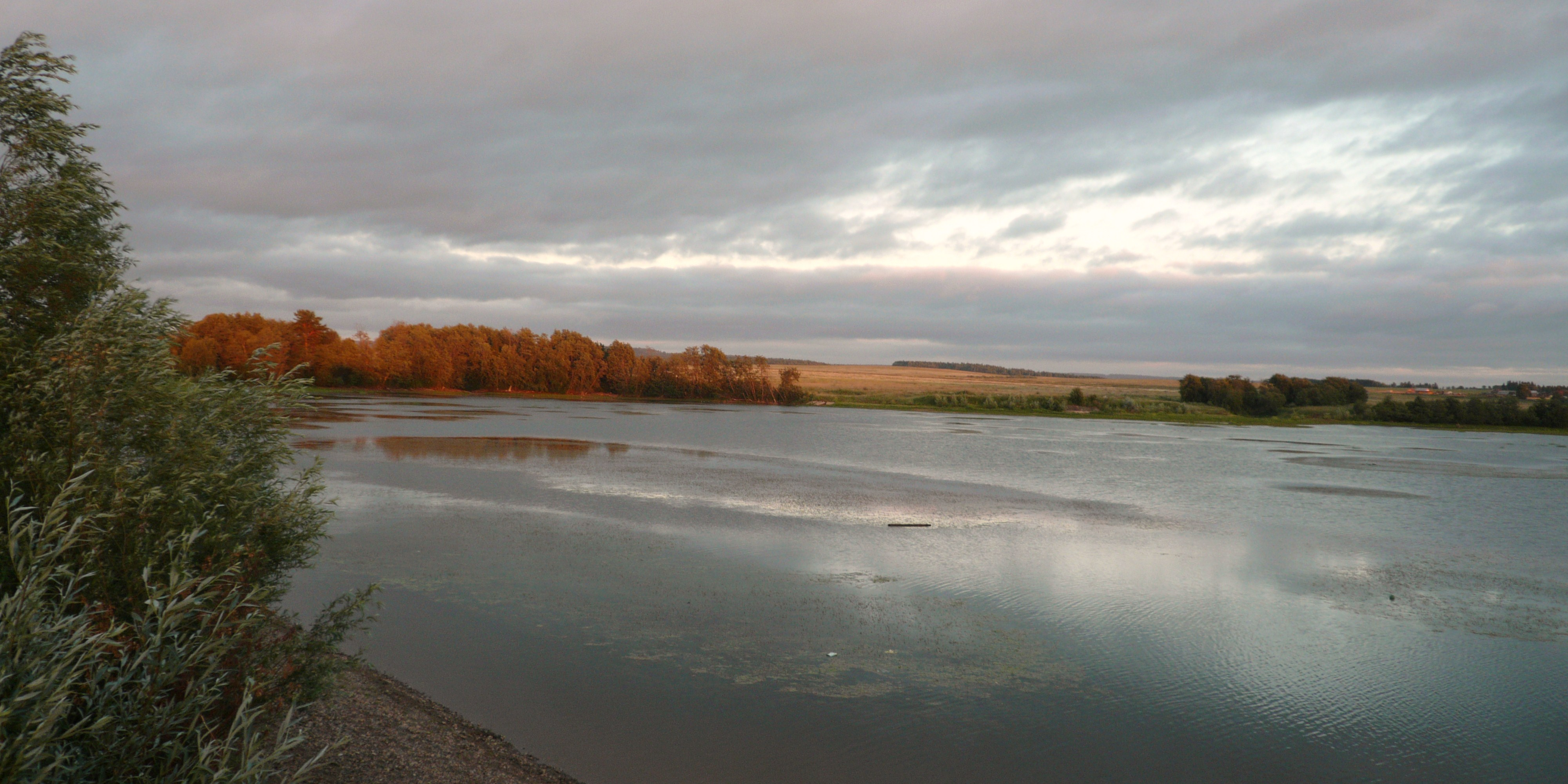
- Pond in Mokino

- Location within Perm Krai Location within Russia
- Coordinates: 57°52′N 55°55′E
- Country: Russia
- Region: Perm Krai
- District: Permsky District
- Time zone: UTC+5:00

Mokino (Russian: Мокино) is a rural locality (a village) in Kultayevskoye Rural Settlement, Permsky District, Perm Krai, Russia. The population was 319 as of 2010. There are 66 streets.

== Geography ==
Mokino is located 27 km southwest of Perm (the district's administrative centre) by road. Bashkultayevo is the nearest rural locality.
