= Małdyty =

- Village
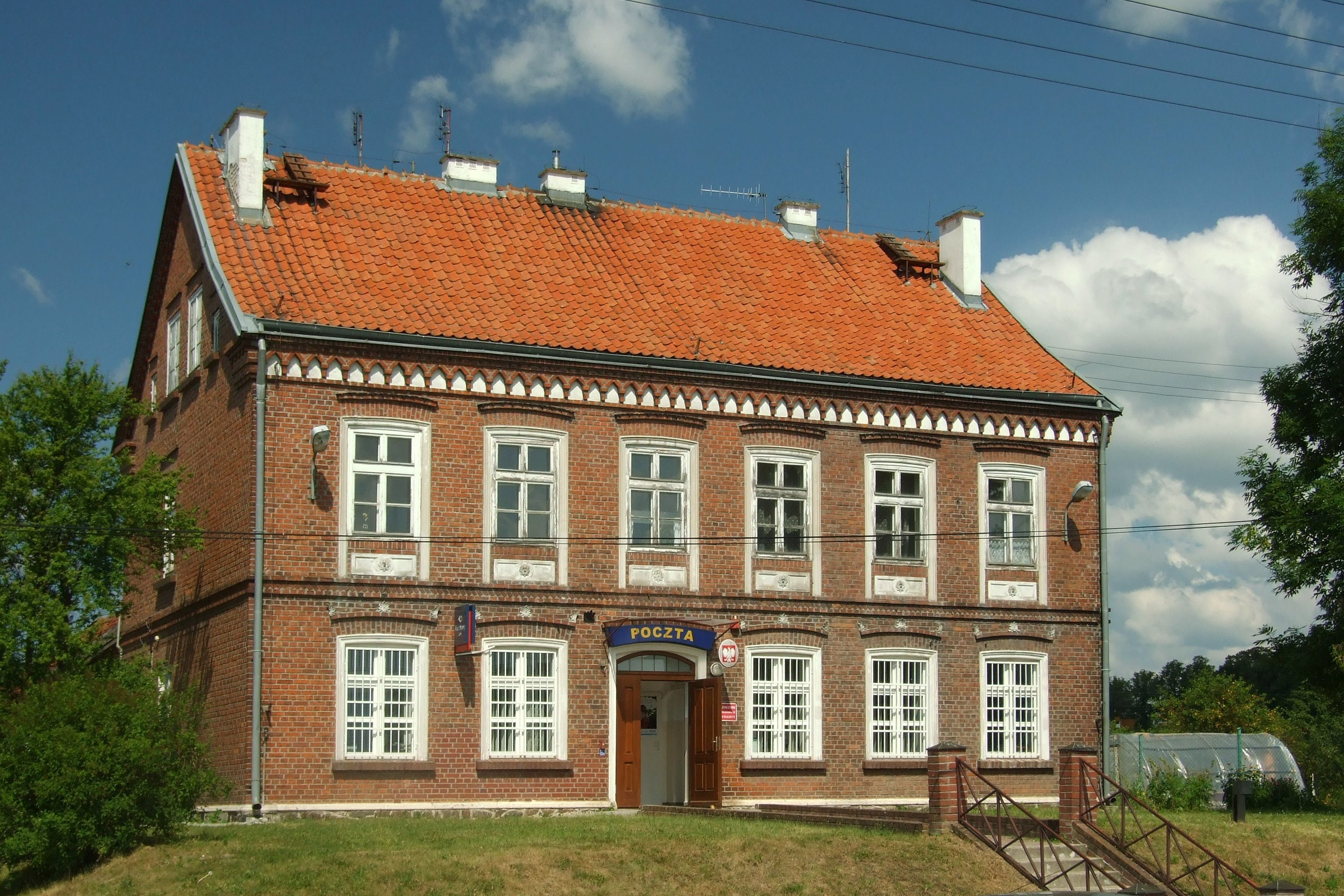
- Post office in Małdyty

- Location within Poland
- Coordinates: 53°55′11″N 19°44′44″E
- Country: Poland
- Voivodeship: Warmian-Masurian
- County: Ostróda
- Gmina: Małdyty
- Population: 1,410

Małdyty [mau̯ˈdɨtɨ] is a village in Ostróda County, Warmian-Masurian Voivodeship, in northern Poland. It is the seat of the gmina (administrative district) called Gmina Małdyty.
