= Kęty, Warmian-Masurian Voivodeship =

Kęty
- Village
- Location within Poland
- Coordinates: 53°50′52″N 19°43′54″E
- Country: Poland
- Voivodeship: Warmian-Masurian
- County: Ostróda
- Gmina: Małdyty
- Population: 80

Kęty [ˈkɛntɨ] is a village in the administrative district of Gmina Małdyty, within Ostróda County, Warmian-Masurian Voivodeship, in northern Poland.
