= Sukhaya, Alexandrovsky District, Perm Krai =

Sukhaya Сухая
- Settlement
- Location within Perm Krai Location within Russia
- Coordinates: 59°33′N 57°48′E
- Country: Russia
- Region: Perm Krai
- District: Alexandrovsky District
- Time zone: UTC+5:00

Sukhaya (Russian: Сухая) is a rural locality (a settlement) in Skopkortnenskoye Rural Settlement, Alexandrovsky District, Perm Krai, Russia. The population was 31 as of 2010. There are 7 streets.

== Geography ==
Sukhaya is located 90 km north of Alexandrovsk (the district's administrative centre) by road. Chikman is the nearest rural locality.
