= Ogryzkovo, Vologda Oblast =

Ogryzkovo Огрызково
- Village
- Location within Vologda Oblast Location within Russia
- Coordinates: 59°56′N 46°38′E
- Country: Russia
- Region: Vologda Oblast
- District: Kichmengsko-Gorodetsky District
- Time zone: UTC+3:00

Ogryzkovo (Russian: Огрызково) is a rural locality (a village) in Yenangskoye Rural Settlement, Kichmengsko-Gorodetsky District, Vologda Oblast, Russia. The population was 4 as of 2002.

== Geography ==
Ogryzkovo is located 68 km southeast of Kichmengsky Gorodok (the district's administrative centre) by road. Matino is the nearest rural locality.
