= Sarna, Warmian-Masurian Voivodeship =

Sarna
- Village
- Location within Poland
- Coordinates: 53°57′24″N 19°45′34″E
- Country: Poland
- Voivodeship: Warmian-Masurian
- County: Ostróda
- Gmina: Małdyty
- Population: 30

Sarna [ˈsarna] is a village in the administrative district of Gmina Małdyty, within Ostróda County, Warmian-Masurian Voivodeship, in northern Poland.
