= Agryzkovo =

Agryzkovo (Russian: Агрызково) is the name of several rural localities in Tver Oblast, Russia:

- Agryzkovo, Vyshnevolotsky District, Tver Oblast, a village in Knyashchinskoye Rural Settlement of Vyshnevolotsky District
- Agryzkovo, Zapadnodvinsky District, Tver Oblast, a village in Benetskoye Rural Settlement of Zapadnodvinsky District
