= Sarna (Punjabi surname) =

Sarna is an Indian surname of Punjabi Khatri community. Notable people with the surname include:

- Dheeraj Sarna, Indian actor and producer
- Jatin Sarna (born 1984), Indian actor
- Mohinder Singh Sarna (1923–2001), Indian novelist
- Mohinder Singh Sarna, also known as S. Mohinder, Indian music director
- Navtej Sarna (born 1957), Indian author-columnist and diplomat
