= Srna =

Srna, sRNA, or SRNA may refer to:

- Darijo Srna (born 1982), Croatian footballer
- Zvonimir Srna, (born 1998), Croatian handball player
- small RNA, abbreviated as sRNA, a class of ribonucleic acid molecule
- soluble RNA, abbreviated as sRNA (now called transfer RNA, abbreviated as tRNA), an adaptor molecule composed of ribonucleic acid
- Student Registered Nurse Anesthetist, a nursing qualification
- SRNA (news agency), a news agency of Republika Srpska, part of the media of Bosnia and Herzegovina
- SRNA Film
