= Surzyki Wielkie =

- Village
- Location within Poland
- Coordinates: 53°49′38″N 19°45′45″E
- Country: Poland
- Voivodeship: Warmian-Masurian
- County: Ostróda
- Gmina: Małdyty
- Population: 50

Surzyki Wielkie [suˈʐɨki ˈvjɛlkʲɛ] (German Groß Sauerken) is a village in the administrative district of Gmina Małdyty, within Ostróda County, Warmian-Masurian Voivodeship, in northern Poland.

As of 2008, the village had a population of 50.
