= Permsky Uyezd =

Permsky Uyezd (Russian: Пермский уезд) was an administrative division of Perm Governorate, Russian Empire, existed until 1923. The administrative center of uyezd was the city of Perm. Area: 27,270.9 km^{2}.

== Demographics ==
At the time of the Russian Empire Census of 1897, Permsky Uyezd had a population of 272,967. Of these, 94.9% spoke Russian, 2.6% Tatar, 1.3% Bashkir, 0.3% Polish, 0.3% Yiddish, 0.2% Komi-Zyrian and 0.1% German as their native language.
