= Nytva =

Town in Perm Krai, Russia

Nytva Нытва
- Town
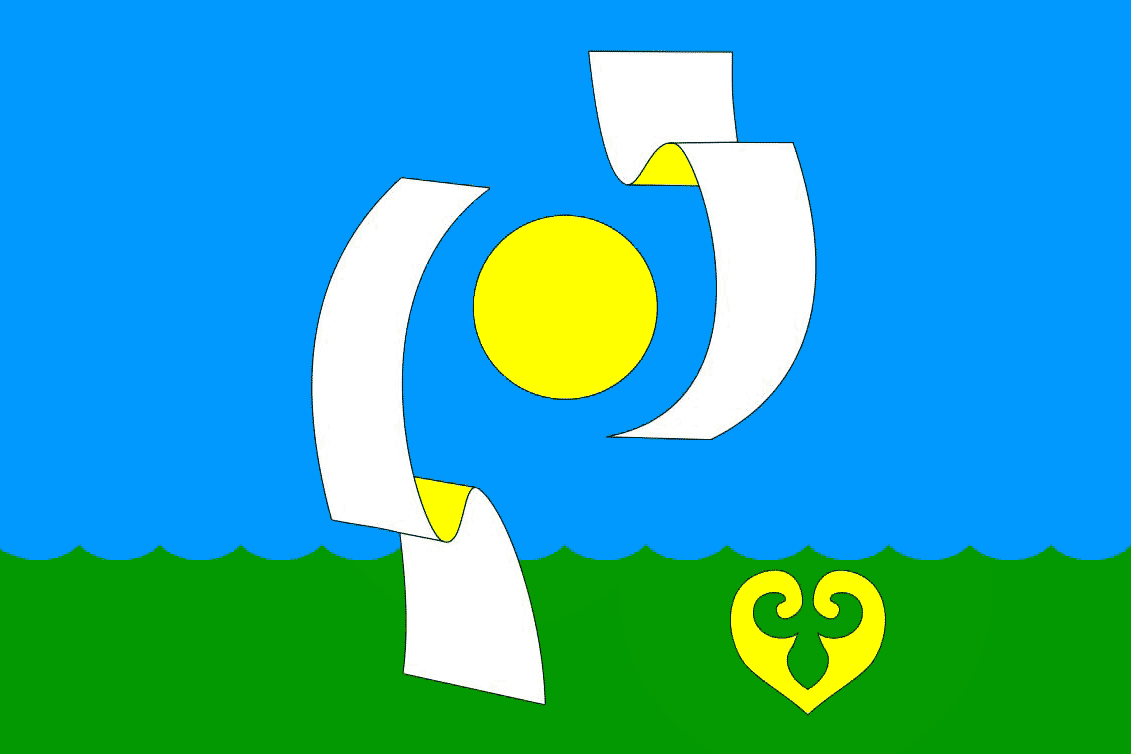
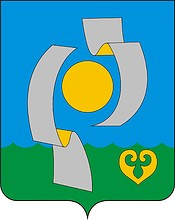
- Flag Coat of arms
- Interactive map of Nytva
- Location of Nytva Nytva (Perm Krai)
- Coordinates: 57°57′N 55°20′E
- Country: Russia
- Federal subject: Perm Krai
- Administrative district: Nytvensky District
- First mentioned: 1623
- Town status since: 1942
- Elevation: 120 m (390 ft)

Population (2010 Census)
  - Total: 19,041
  - Estimate (2023): 16,463 (−13.5%)

Administrative status
  - Capital of: Nytvensky District

Municipal status
  - Municipal district: Nytvensky Municipal District
  - Urban settlement: Nytvenskoye Urban Settlement
  - Capital of: Nytvensky Municipal District, Nytvenskoye Urban Settlement
- Time zone: UTC+5 (MSK+2)
- Postal codes: 617000, 617001
- OKTMO ID: 57727000001
- Website: gorodnytva.ru

Nytva (Russian: Ны́тва) is a town and the administrative center of Nytvensky District in Perm Krai, Russia, located on the Nytva River near its confluence with the Kama, 70 kilometers (43 mi) west of Perm, the administrative center of the krai. Population: 19,041 (2010 census); 20,660 (2002 census); 21,861 (1989 Soviet census).

== Etymology ==
"Nytva" can mean green water in the Komi-Permyak language and silt water in the Mansi language.

== History ==
The village of Nytva was first mentioned in 1623.

In 1756 the Nytvensky copper smelting plant was built. Its founder is considered to be Maria Stroganova. By the end of the 1780s, the factory had become an ironworks and rolling mill. A quay and shipyard were built on the river. At the factory anchors and hammers were produced.

In 1913 railway was laid.

In 1928 Nytva gained a status of worker settlement. The status of city was obtained on June 19, 1942.

== Administrative and municipal status ==
Within the framework of administrative divisions, Nytva serves as the administrative center of Nytvensky District, to which it is directly subordinated. As a municipal division, the town of Nytvensky, together with eight rural localities, is incorporated within Nytvensky Municipal District as Nytvenskoye Urban Settlement.

== Culture ==
The Nytva Museum of Local History was established in 1958. One of its most interesting exhibitions is the Spoon Museum, whose collection includes over 1,700 various spoon items from fifty-seven countries.
