= Nytvensky District =

Nytvensky District Нытвенский район (Russian)
- District
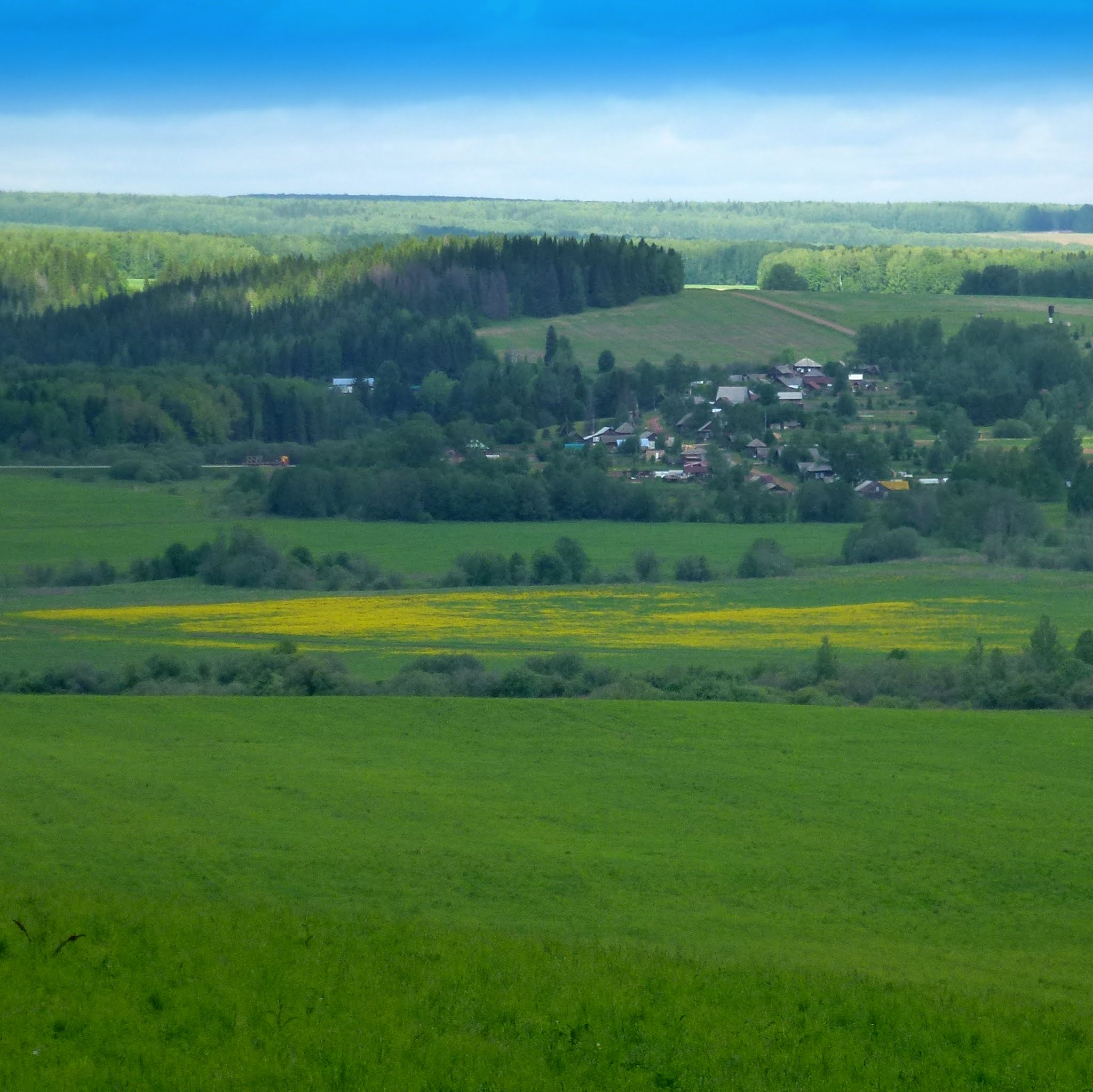
- Landscape in Nytvensky District

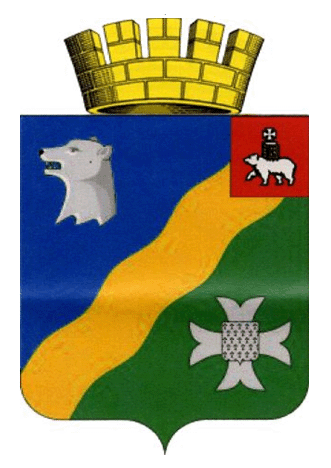
- Flag Coat of arms
- Location of Nytvensky District in Perm Krai
- Coordinates: 58.149°N 55.363°E
- Country: Russia
- Federal subject: Perm Krai
- Established: December 1923
- Administrative center: Nytva

Area
  - Total: 1,656 km^{2} (639 sq mi)

Population (2010 Census)
  - Total: 43,812
  - Density: 26.46/km^{2} (68.52/sq mi)
  - Urban: 70.1%
  - Rural: 29.9%

Administrative structure
  - Inhabited localities: 1 cities/towns, 2 urban-type settlements, 114 rural localities

Municipal structure
  - Municipally incorporated as: Nytvensky Municipal District
  - Municipal divisions: 3 urban settlements, 5 rural settlements
- Website: http://nytva.permarea.ru/

Nytvensky District (Russian: Ны́твенский райо́н) is an administrative district (raion) of Perm Krai, Russia; one of the thirty-three in the krai. Municipally, it is incorporated as Nytvensky Municipal District. It is in the southwestern central part of the krai. The area of the district is 1,656 square kilometers (639 sq mi). Its administrative center is the town of Nytva. Population: 43,812 (2010 census); 47,779 (2002 census); 50,338 (1989 Soviet census). The population of Nytva accounts for 43.5% of the district's total population.

== Notable residents ==
- Evgeniy Garanichev (born 1988 in Novoilyinsky), biathlete
