= Permsky District =

Perm District Пермский район (Russian)
- District
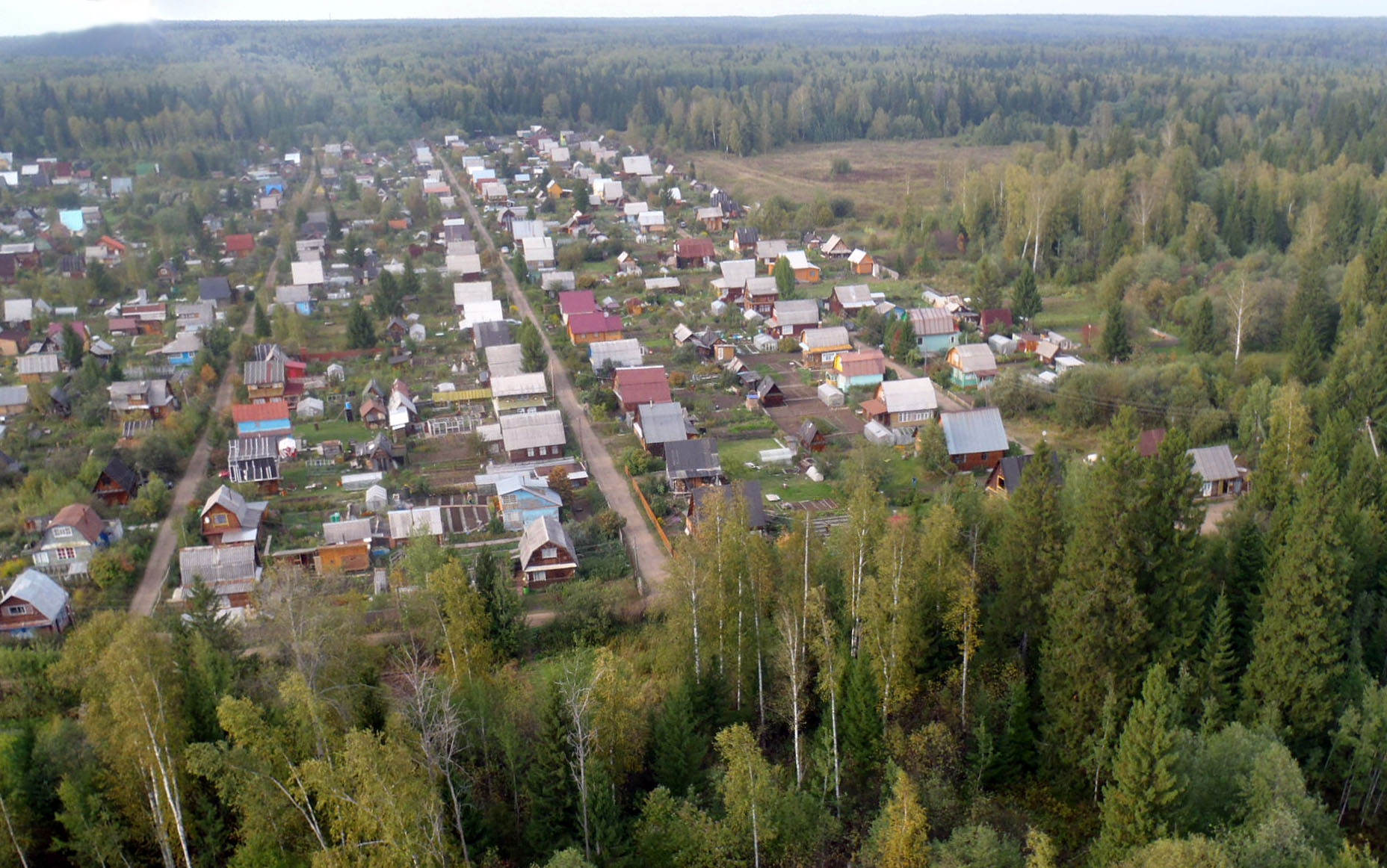
- Country cooperative in Permsky District

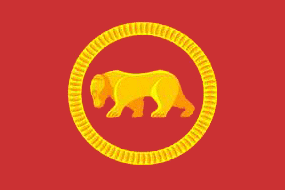
- Flag Coat of arms
- Location of Permsky District in Perm Krai
- Coordinates: 57.791°N 56.117°E
- Country: Russia
- Federal subject: Perm Krai
- Established: March 26, 1939
- Administrative center: Perm

Area
  - Total: 3,753 km^{2} (1,449 sq mi)

Population (2010 Census)
  - Total: 103,444
  - Density: 27.56/km^{2} (71.39/sq mi)
  - Urban: 0%
  - Rural: 100%

Administrative structure
  - Inhabited localities: 223 rural localities

Municipal structure
  - Municipally incorporated as: Permsky Municipal District
  - Municipal divisions: 0 urban settlements, 17 rural settlements
- Time zone: UTC+5 (MSK+2)
- OKTMO ID: 57646000
- Website: http://www.permraion.ru/

Perm District (Russian: Пе́рмский райо́н, Pérmskiĭ raĭón) is an administrative district (raion), one of the thirty-three in Perm Krai, Russia. Population - 116,353 (2021)

== Geography ==
The Perm district is located in the suburban area of Perm. It borders on Krasnokamsk municipality, Dobryansk municipality, Chusovskoy municipality, Kungur municipal district, Okhansk municipality as well as Nytvensk municipality along the river Kama. The district has 17 rural settlements comprising 223 communities.

The area of the district is 3753.05 km^{2}.

== History ==
Perm uyezd was one of the 16 constituent districts of Perm province, formed by the manifesto of Catherine the Great in 1775.

Kultaevski district (administrative centre is Kultaevo village) was formed as a part of Perm district of Uralian region in December 1923. In December 1924 administrative centre of the district was moved to Verkhniye Mulli village.

Kultaevo district (at the initiative of the population) was renamed into Kalininskiy district in December 1925.

The Kalininsky district was united with the Motovilikhinsky district into one Kalininsky district with the centre in the town of Perm in October 1927 (the All-Russian Central Executive Committee decision of 14.10.1927).

In 1931 Kalininsky district was united with a part of liquidated Leninsky (Grigoryevsky), Yugovsky and South-Osokinsky districts into one Perm district with the centre in Perm (administrated by the city council).

On March 26, 1939, there was a decree of the Presidium of the Supreme Soviet of RSFSR on the formation of Verkhne-Mullinsky district, later renamed to Perm district. It included 94 collective farms, 5 state farms, 5 industrial collective farms, 2 machine-tractor stations.

== Economy ==
Location in the suburban area of the regional centre gives specific character to the farms: dairy and vegetable, egg and poultry production. Well-known enterprises include the Verkhnemullinsky livestock breeding farm, the Russian agricultural holding company and State Horse Breeding Farm. All of them have been liquidated due to bankruptcy.

== Transport ==
The Trans-Siberian Railway and "Perm-Yekaterinburg" line pass through the raion. The boundaries of the area are washed by the waters of two reservoirs, the Kama and the Votkinsk. In summer the Yugo-Kamski-Okhansk and Mostovaya-Nasadka ferries operate. In the Perm District is the "air gate" of Perm International Airport Bolshoye Savino (18 km from the city centre of Perm).

There are two major oil and gas pipelines of Russian and international importance running through the Perm District: Surgut-Polotsk and Urengoy-Centre.

== Administrative and municipal status ==
Within the framework of administrative divisions, Permsky District is one of the thirty-three in the krai. The city of Perm serves as its administrative center, despite being incorporated separately as a city of krai significance—an administrative unit with the status equal to that of the districts.

As a municipal division, the district is incorporated as Permsky Municipal District. The city of krai significance of Perm is incorporated separately from the district as Perm Urban Okrug.

== Notable residents ==
- Ilya Berezin (1818–1896), Orientalist, born in the settlement of Yug
- Fyodor Panayev (1856–1933), teacher and climatologist, born in Yug

== See also ==
- Alebastrovo
- Zaborye
- Zagrishinskoye
- Zavedeniye
- Zaykovo

== Sources ==
- Законодательное собрание Пермской области. Закон №416-67 от 28 февраля 1996 г. «Об административно-территориальном устройстве Пермского края», в ред. Закона №504-ПК от 9 июля 2015 г. «О внесении изменений в Закон Пермской области "Об административно-территориальном устройстве Пермского края"». Вступил в силу с момента опубликования. Опубликован: "Звезда", №38, 12 марта 1996 г. (Legislative Assembly of Perm Oblast. Law #416-67 of February 28, 1996 On the Administrative-Territorial Structure of Perm Krai, as amended by the Law #504-PK of July 9, 2015 On Amending the Law of Perm Oblast "On the Administrative-Territorial Structure of Perm Krai". Effective as of the moment of publication.).
- Законодательное собрание Пермской области. Закон №1868-402 от 1 декабря 2004 г. «Об утверждении границ и о наделении статусом муниципальных образований Пермского района Пермского края», в ред. Закона №273-ПК от 14 декабря 2013 г. «О внесении изменений в отдельные Законы Пермской области, Коми-Пермяцкого автономного округа, Пермского края». Вступил в силу через десять дней со дня официального опубликования. Опубликован: "Бюллетень Законодательного Собрания и администрации Пермской области", №1, II часть, 27 января 2005 г. (Legislative Assembly of Perm Oblast. Law #1868-402 of December 1, 2004 On Establishing the Borders and on Granting the Status to the Municipal Formations of Permsky District of Perm Krai, as amended by the Law #273-PK of December 14, 2013 On Amending Various Laws of Perm Oblast, Komi-Permyak Autonomous Okrug, Perm Krai. Effective as of the day which is ten days following the day of the official publication.).
- Законодательное собрание Пермской области. Закон №2038-446 от 11 февраля 2005 г. «Об утверждении границ и о наделении статусом муниципального образования "Город Пермь" Пермского края», в ред. Закона №499-ПК от 16 октября 2009 г «О внесении изменений в отдельные законодательные акты Пермской области и Коми-Пермяцкого автономного округа». Вступил в силу через десять дней со дня официального опубликования (12 марта 2005 г.), за исключением отдельных положений, вступивших в силу в иные сроки. Опубликован: "Российская газета", №41, 2 марта 2005 г. (Legislative Assembly of Perm Oblast. Law #2038-446 of February 11, 2005 On Establishing the Borders and on Granting the Status to the Municipal Formation of the "City of Perm" of Perm Krai, as amended by the Law #499-PK of October 16, 2009 On Amending Various Legislative Acts of Perm Oblast and Komi-Permyak Autonomous Okrug. Effective as of the day which is ten days following the day of the official publication (March 12, 2005), with the exception of certain clauses, which took effect on different dates.).
