= List of lakes of Poland =

The following is a list of lakes of Poland.

- Białe Augustowskie
- Białe Jezioro (Bytów County)
- Borówno Lake
- Bukówka Lake
- Chełmża Lake
- Chłop Lake
- Czarny Staw pod Rysami
- Dąbie
- Dobskie Lake
- Drawsko Lake
- Ełk Lake
- Eye of the Sea (Warsaw)
- Gaładuś Lake
- Głębokie Lake
- Gołdapiwo
- Gopło
- Gosławskie Lake
- Great Dąbrowa
- Großer Mützelburger See
- Gwiazdy
- Jamno
- Jeziorak
- Jezioro Białe (Gostynin County)
- Karaś Lake
- Karwowo Lake
- Kojle
- Konin Lakes
- Krasiński Garden Pond
- Kunów Lake
- Lake Czorsztyn
- Lake Czos
- Lake Dobczyce
- Lake Drwęca
- Lake Firlej
- Lake Gardno
- Lake Goszcza
- Lake Kurtkowiec
- Lake Leśnia
- Lake Lidzbark
- Lake Lubie
- Lake Malta
- Lake Mamry
- Lake Nidzkie
- Lake Niegocin
- Lake Pauzeńskie
- Lake Roś
- Lake Rożnów
- Lake Ruda Woda
- Lake Rusałka (Poznań)
- Lake Solina
- Lake Szeląg Mały
- Lake Tarnobrzeg
- Lake Ukiel
- Lake Uścimowiec
- Lake Żarnowiec
- Łańskie Lake
- Łebsko Lake
- Lednica
- Licheńskie Lake
- Lipno
- Little Dąbrowa
- Łuknajno
- Mały Staw
- Masurian Lake District
- Miedwie
- Mikorzyńskie Lake
- Milicz Ponds
- Morskie Oko
- Morzycko Lake
- Myśliborskie Lake
- Nyskie Lake
- Orzysz
- Ostrowskie Lake
- Otmuchów Lake
- Paczkowski Lake
- Pątnowskie Lake
- Persian Lake
- Pogoria
- Pogubie Wielkie
- Resko Przymorskie
- Rusałka (Szczecin)
- Sajmino
- Ślesińskie Lake
- Słup Lake
- Słupca Lake
- Śniardwy
- Sosnówka
- Srebrne Lake
- Stawiki
- Studnica
- Sulejów Reservoir
- Sunny Lake
- Świdwie
- Szarcz Lake
- Tatra lakes
- Turawskie Lake
- Valley of Three Ponds
- Wąsosze
- Wet Lake (Kuyavia-Pomerania Voivodeship)
- Wet Lake (Warmia-Masuria Voivodeship)
- Wicko
- Wielki Staw
- Wielki Staw Polski
- Wigry Lake
- Włocławek Reservoir
- Zdwórz Lake
- Zegrze Reservoir
- Żelazny Most
- Zielony Staw Gąsienicowy
- Żywiec Lake
