= Pątnowskie Lake =

- Location within Poland
- Coordinates: 52°18′17″N 18°17′03″E
- Type: lake
- Basin countries: Poland
- Max. length: 4 km (2.5 mi)
- Max. width: 1 km (0.62 mi)
- Surface area: 2.83 km^{2} (1.09 sq mi)
- Average depth: 2.6 m (8 ft 6 in)
- Max. depth: 5.5 m (18 ft)
- Water volume: 0.073 km^{3} (0.018 cu mi)

Pątnowskie Lake is a lake in central Poland known as Jezioro Pątnowskie in Polish. It is located in Konin County in Gmina Ślesin, near the town of Licheń Stary. It is a post-glacial ribbon lake with a weakly developed shoreline. To the north it is connected to Ślesińskie Lake and Mikorzyńskie Lake and forms part of the 32-kilometer navigable Ślesińskie Canal.

It is one of several lakes known collectively as the heated Konin Lakes because the water temperature is raised as a result of the outflow received from two power stations. Pątnowskie Lake receives the outflow throughout the year and has a thriving population of fish including common bream, carp, common roach, tench, grass carp, silver carp, bighead carp and zander. It is popular with anglers. With its large area and open shoreline, the lake is used recreationally for sailing and windsurfing and, being permanently free of ice, a winter regatta is held here.
