= Mikorzyńskie Lake =

Lake in central Poland

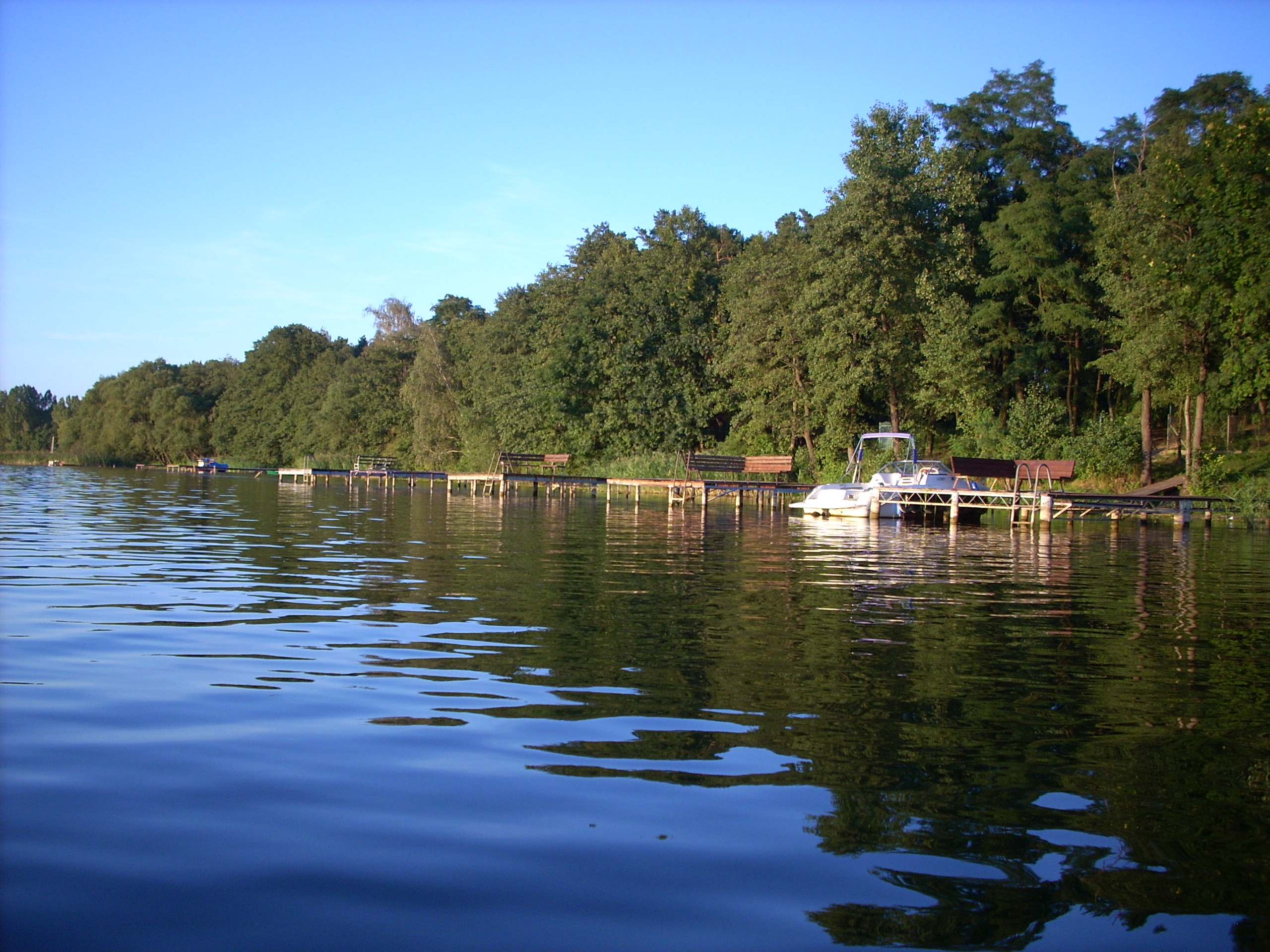
- Mikorzyńskie Lake

- Location within Poland
- Coordinates: 52°20′55″N 18°18′12″E
- Type: lake
- Basin countries: Poland
- Max. length: 6.6 km (4.1 mi)
- Max. width: 1.0 km (0.62 mi)
- Surface area: 2.51 km^{2} (0.97 sq mi)
- Average depth: 11.5 m (38 ft)
- Max. depth: 36.5 m (120 ft)
- Water volume: 0.029 km^{3} (0.0070 cu mi)

Mikorzyńskie Lake is a lake in central Poland known as Jezioro Mikorzyńskie in Polish. It is located in Konin County in Gmina Ślesin, near the town of Licheń Stary. It is a post-glacial ribbon lake with a strongly developed shoreline. To the north it is connected to Ślesińskie Lake while to the south it adjoins Pątnowskie Lake. It is part of the 32-kilometer navigable Ślesińskie Canal.

The banks of the lake, which are mostly steep, are largely surrounded by forests. It is one of several lakes known collectively as the heated Konin Lakes because the water temperature is raised as a result of the outflow received from two power stations.
