= Gaładuś Lake =

Gaładuś
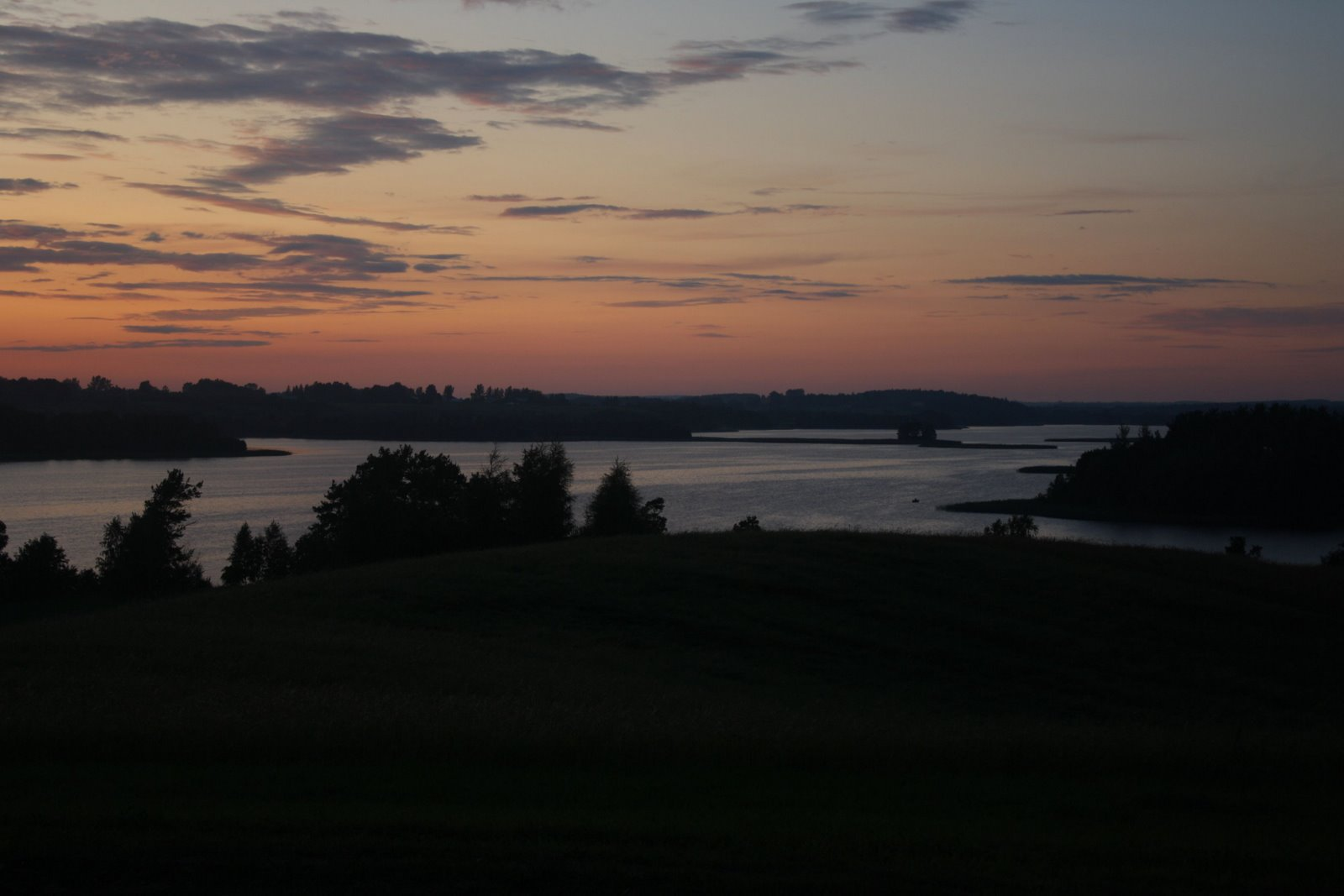
- Gaładuś Lake at twilight.

- Location within Poland
- Coordinates: 54°10′06″N 23°25′14″E
- Type: Ribbon lake
- Basin countries: Poland, Lithuania
- Max. length: 10.6 km (6.6 mi)
- Max. width: 1.5 km (0.93 mi)
- Surface area: 7.29 km^{2} (2.81 sq mi)
- Average depth: 12.7 m (42 ft)
- Max. depth: 54.8 m (180 ft)
- Water volume: 1,606,000 m^{3} (1,302 acre⋅ft)
- Surface elevation: 134.3 m (441 ft)

Gaładuś (Lithuanian: Galadusys) is a ribbon lake located in the Suwałki Region, where it is the second largest lake by area. The lake is located in the north-east of Poland and the south of Lithuania. The lake is located in the Gmina Sejny, Podlaskie Voivodeship in Poland, and in the region of Lazdijai in Lithuania. The lake has high and non-forested banks. The lake and its catchment area is found in the drainage basin of the Neman, in the watershed of the Biała Hańcza (Baltoji Ančia).
