= Białe Augustowskie (lake) =

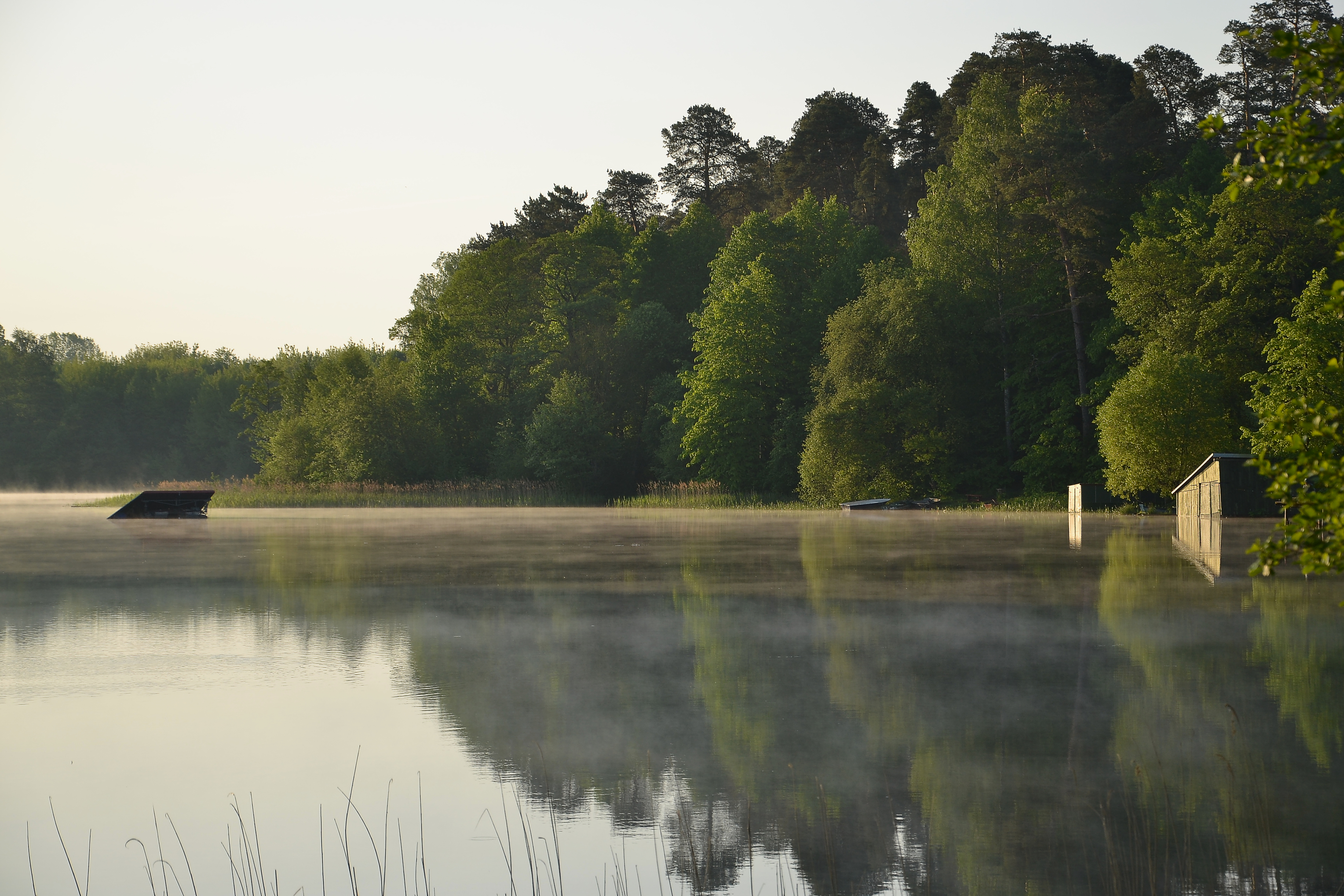
- Białe Augustowskie Lake

- Location within Podlaskie Voivodeship
- Coordinates: 53°51′51″N 23°01′56″E
- Type: Ribbon lake
- Basin countries: Poland
- Max. length: 6 km (3.7 mi)
- Max. width: 1.35 km (0.84 mi)
- Surface area: 4.766 km^{2} (1.840 sq mi)
- Average depth: 8.7 m (29 ft)
- Max. depth: 30 m (98 ft)
- Water volume: 41.7×10^{6} m^{3} (1.47×10^{9} cu ft)
- Shore length^{1}: 18.65 km (11.59 mi)
- Surface elevation: 122 m (400 ft)
- Frozen: For period 1977–1992 usually between 16 December and 22 March with typical ice thickness 33 cm (13 in)
- ^{1} Shore length is not a well-defined measure.

Białe Augustowskie (Polish: Jezioro Białe Augustowskie; Lithuanian: Baltis) - is a ribbon lake in Augustów. Other names: Białe Lake (White Lake) or Krechowieckie Lake.

The lake has an area of about 480 ha (1,200 acres). The lakeside is well developed with numerous bays (Orzechówka, Tartaczna, Wierszowiec) and spits (southern lakeside - Pień, Dąbek, Lisi Ogon, northern lakeside - Ostry Róg). A majority of the lakeside is high and barren, forested with creeping pine. There are four islands in the lake (with a total area of 1.5 ha (3.7 acres)).
