= Ostrowskie Lake =

Lake in Poland

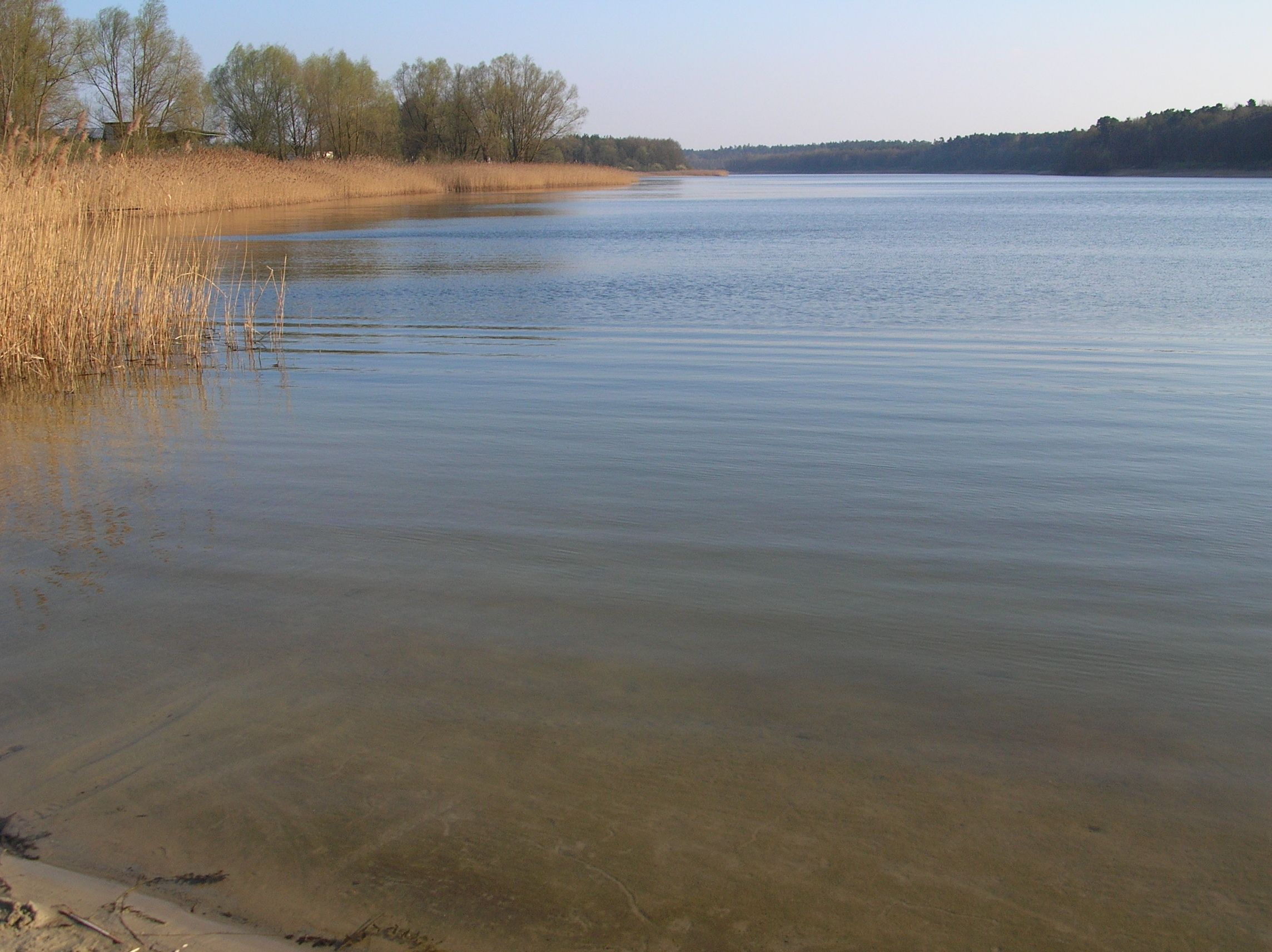

- Location within Kuyavian-Pomeranian Voivodeship
- Coordinates: 52°31′42″N 18°07′25″E
- Basin countries: Poland
- Max. length: 6.6 km (4.1 mi)
- Max. depth: 32.6 m (107 ft)

Ostrowskie Lake is a lake in Kuyavian-Pomeranian Voivodeship, north-central Poland, in the Gmina Jeziora Wielkie. It's a Glacial lake more specifically, a Ribbon lake.
