= Gwiazdy (lake) =

Lake in Pomeranian Voivodeship, Poland

- Location within Poland Location within Pomeranian Voivodeship
- Location: Pomeranian Voivodeship
- Coordinates: 53°59′8″N 17°17′14″E
- Type: ribbon lake
- Basin countries: Poland
- Max. length: 5.7 km (3.5 mi)
- Max. width: 0.7 km (0.43 mi)
- Surface area: 210.4 ha (520 acres)
- Average depth: 3 m (9.8 ft)
- Max. depth: 10 m (33 ft)

Gwiazdy is a ribbon lake situated in Pomeranian Voivodeship in Bytów County; in Bytów Lakeland. Chocina River starts its flow from this lake. It covers an area of 210.4 ha being 5.7 km long and 0.2-0.7 km wide. The average depth is three m and the maximum is ten m.

== See also ==
- Borowy Młyn, Bytów County
