= Licheńskie Lake =

Lake in Poland

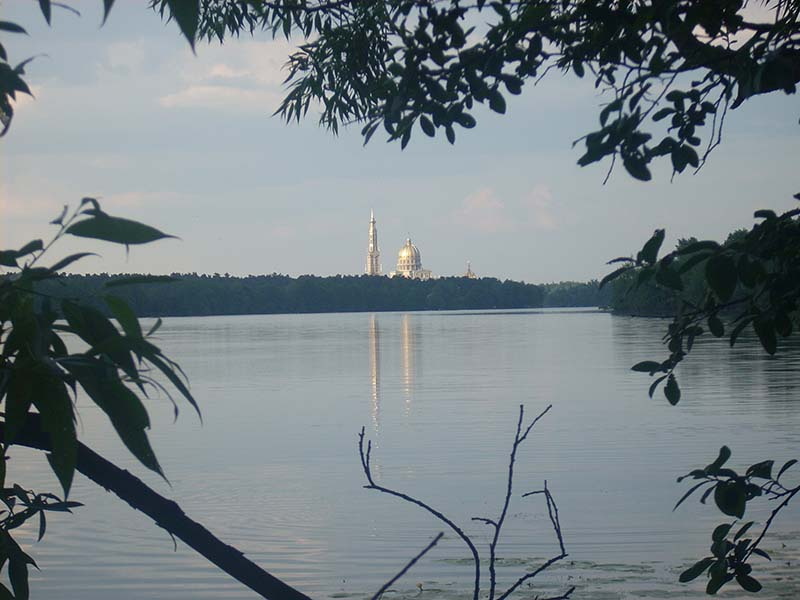
- Licheńskie Lake

- Location within Poland
- Coordinates: 52°18′30″N 18°20′19″E
- Type: lake
- Basin countries: Poland
- Surface area: 1.46 km^{2} (0.56 sq mi)
- Average depth: 4.5 m (15 ft)
- Max. depth: 12.8 m (42 ft)

Licheńskie Lake is a small lake in central Poland known as Jezioro Licheńskie in Polish. It is located in Konin County in Gmina Ślesin, near the town of Licheń Stary. It is a classic plostglacial ribbon lake with a strongly developed shoreline. The banks of the lake, which are mostly steep, are largely surrounded by forests. It is one of several lakes known collectively as the heated Konin Lakes because the water temperature is abnormally high due to the inflow of water from the cooling systems of two power stations.
