= Chłop Lake =

Lake in Poland

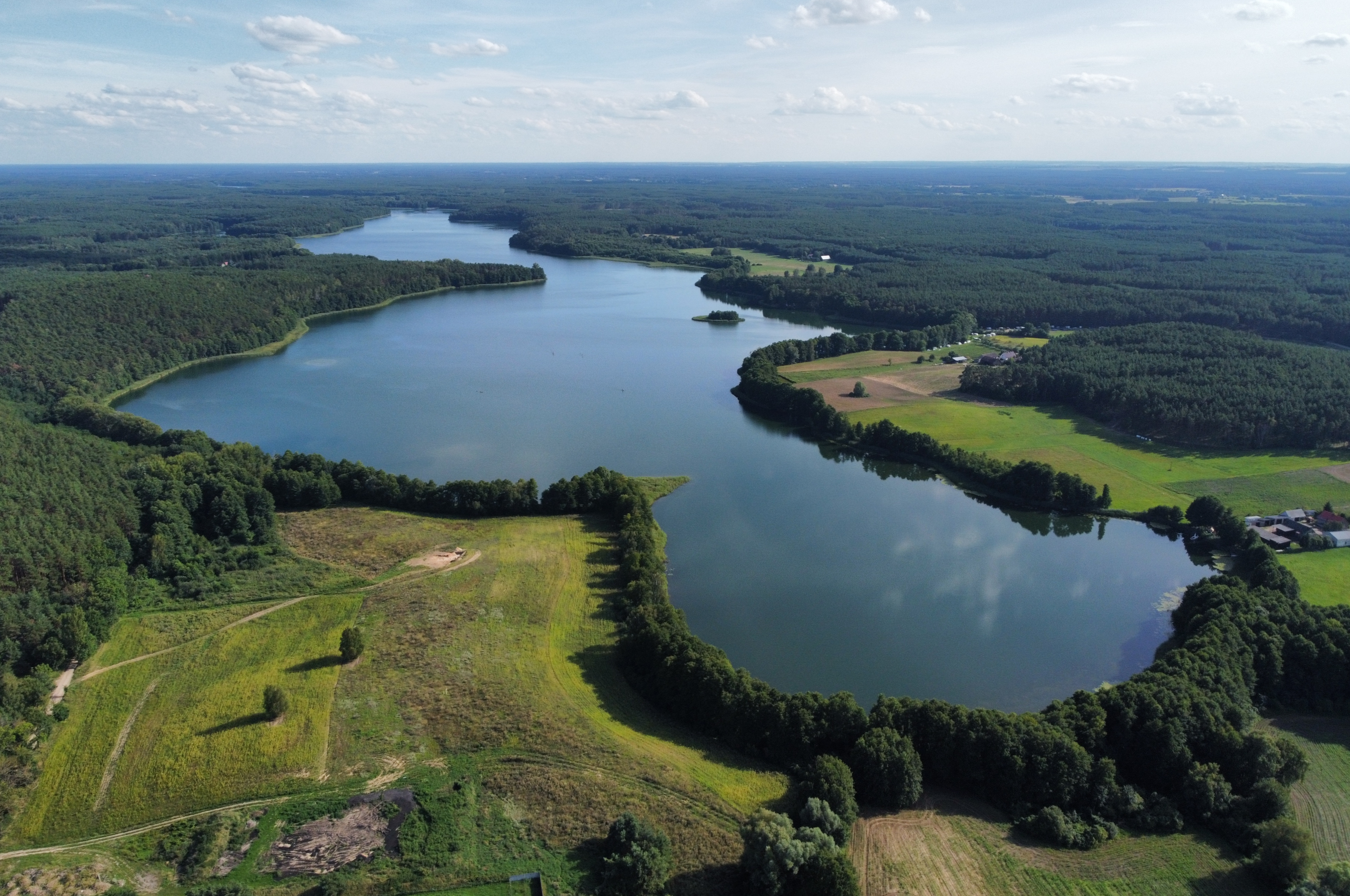
- Chłop Lake as seen from the air
- Interactive map of Chłop Lake
- Location: Zbąszyń Ridge, Poland
- Coordinates: 52°26′51″N 15°47′53″E
- Type: ribbon lake
- Max. length: 4.15 km (2.58 mi)
- Max. width: 0.97 km (0.60 mi)
- Surface area: 2.23–2.28 km^{2} (0.86–0.88 sq mi)
- Average depth: 9.0 m (29.5 ft)
- Max. depth: 23.0 m (75.5 ft)
- Water volume: 20,579,600 m^{3} (726,760,000 cu ft)
- Shore length^{1}: 12.35 km (7.67 mi)
- Surface elevation: 53.7 m (176 ft)
- Islands: 1
- ^{1} Shore length is not a well-defined measure.

Chłop Lake is a ribbon lake located within the Pszczew Landscape Park, in the Lubusz Voivodeship, in the Międzyrzecz County, in the Gmina Pszczew. About 1 km from the northern end of the lake lies the town of Pszczew.

== Location and description ==
Chłop Lake is located in the central part of the Pszczew Landscape Park. The southeastern shore of the lake marks the border between the Lubusz and Greater Poland Voivodeships. Chłop Lake is a ribbon lake of glacial origin, quite large and relatively deep. It stretches from north to south and has a well-developed shoreline with a narrow, winding bay in the eastern part, into which the large peninsula known as Jelenia Głowa protrudes from the south. The lake is almost entirely surrounded by forests. Along the eastern shore of the lake, there are elevations, with the highest, Góra Wysoka, rising to 101 meters above sea level. There is one small island on the lake. The bottom of the body of water is diverse, with several deeper spots and numerous shallows. Three small streams flow into the lake, two of which periodically dry up. Excess water is drained to the south by a small stream into Wędromierz Lake.

== Hydronymics ==
The lake appears in sources as early as 1460, initially as Chlop, and later as: Chlop (1564, 1594), Chłop (1640), Klop See (1845), Klopp See (1940). Currently, the standardized name Chłop is in use, and the national register of geographic names does not list any alternative or additional names.

== Morphometrics ==
According to the data from the Inland Fisheries Institute, the surface area of the lake's water mirror is 2.28 square kilometers, while A. Choiński, using a planimeter on maps at a scale of 1:50,000, determined the lake's size to be 2.23 square kilometers. The uniform part of the lake's surface waters covers an area of 215 hectares.

The average depth of the water reservoir is 9.0 meters, and the maximum depth is 23.0 meters. The volume of the lake is 20,579.6 thousand m^{3}. The maximum length of the lake is 4.15 kilometers, and the width is 0.97 kilometers. The length of the shoreline is 12.35 kilometers.

According to the Atlas of Polish Lakes (ed. J. Jańczak, 1996), the water level is at an altitude of 53.7 meters above sea level, while according to the numerical terrain model provided by Geoportal, the water level is at an altitude of 52.5 meters above sea level.

According to the Map of the Hydrographic Division of Poland, the lake is located in the drainage basin of the tenth level. The identifier is 187875921. The direct drainage basin of the lake covers an area of 77.2 km^{2}.

== Development ==
In the water management system, the lake forms a uniform water body part with the code PLLW10360. The administrator is the Regional Water Management Board in Poznań, which has established a fishery district covering the waters of this lake called the Fishery District of Chłop Lake on the Struga Wrońska watercourse – No. 1. The fishery management on the lake is conducted by the Trzciel Fisheries Farm.

The lake serves recreational purposes. In 2006, there were several recreational centers, two camping sites, and numerous holiday cottages around the lake. On the eastern shore of the water body near Góra Wysoka, one of three identical observation towers built by the Gmina Pszczew is located. The tower measures 18.66 meters.

== Water purity and environmental protection ==
In the years 1985, 1994, 2000, and 2006, the waters of Chłop Lake were classified as Class II purity. Comparing the results from these years indicates that the water quality of Chłop Lake has not undergone significant changes. Over the years, water transparency has fluctuated depending on the season, ranging from 1.7 to 3.7 meters. Environmental inspectors from the Regional Inspectorate for Environmental Protection pointed out that the construction of a sewage treatment plant for Pszczew in 1996, along with the discharge of treated sewage directly into the Obra river, outside the lake's catchment area, contributed to maintaining water quality. The closure of the distillery in Pszczew, which was discharging sewage directly into the lake, also had a positive impact on water cleanliness.

Chłop Lake has been classified as fairly resistant to degrading external influences, thus falling into the II category of susceptibility to degradation. This means that it is a lake with good natural conditions. Factors negatively affecting this indicator include a low level of thermal stratification and the shoreline-to-volume ratio. On the other hand, factors contributing positively to the lake's resilience include low water turnover (40% annually), a relatively small catchment area compared to its volume, considerable average depth, and the predominance of forests in the immediate vicinity of the lake.

Research conducted in 2020 classified the waters of the lake as having a good ecological status, corresponding to Class II quality. The classification was based on the ecological status of macrophytes, ichthyofauna, and benthic invertebrates, while phytoplankton and phytobenthos were assessed as very good. However, the chemical state of the waters was determined to be below good, with exceeding permissible concentrations of PBDE, mercury, and heptachlor in fish tissues. Water transparency was measured at 2.8 meters.

The lake is located within the Pszczew Landscape Park established in 1986 and within the boundaries of two Natura 2000 network areas: the Special Area of Conservation Rynna Jezior Obrzańskich PLH080002 and the Special Protection Area Jeziora Pszczewskie i Dolina Obry PLB080005.
