= Słupca =

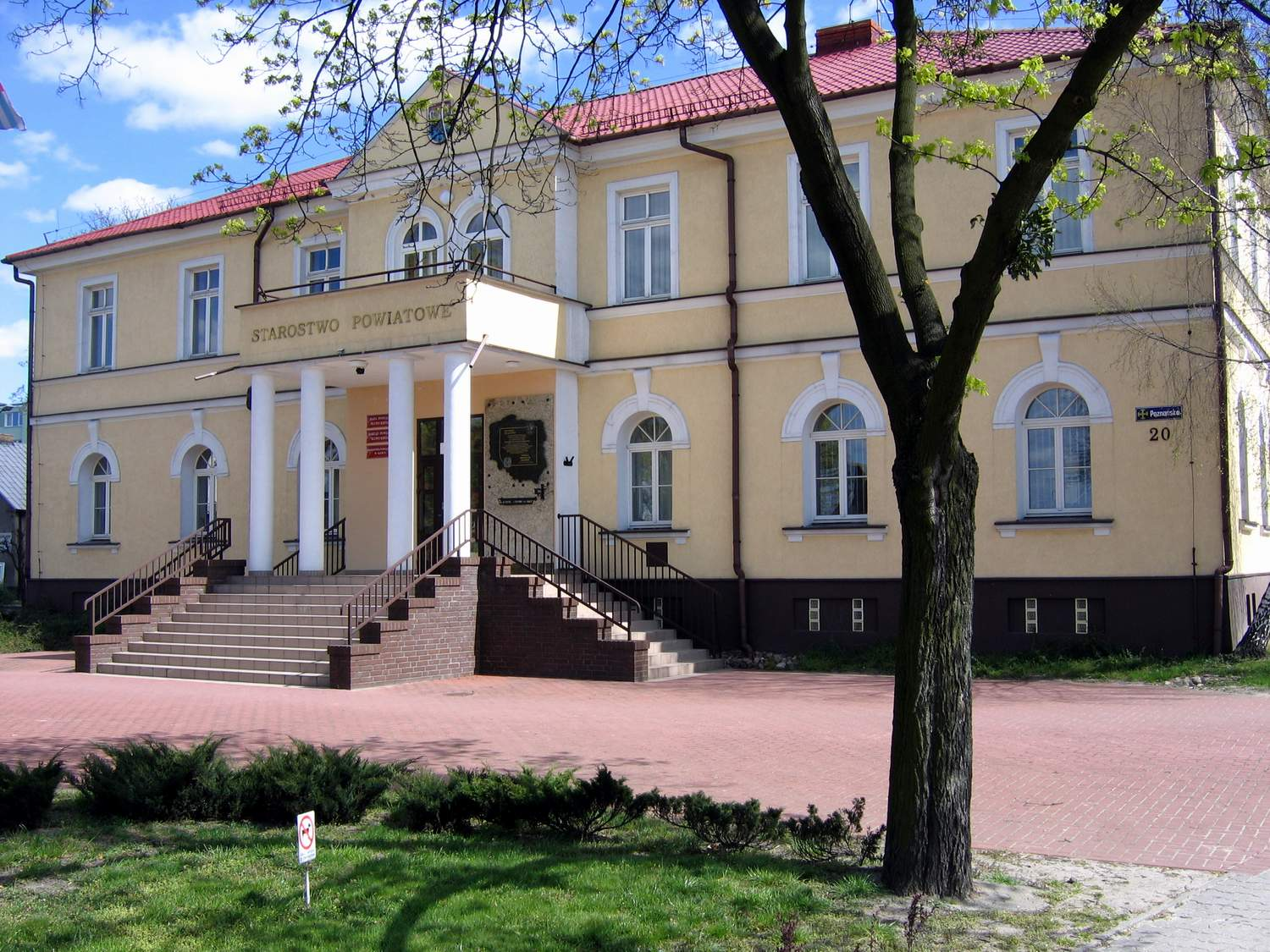
- Słupca County administration building

- Flag Coat of arms

- Location within Poland
- Coordinates: 52°18′N 17°52′E
- Country: Poland
- Voivodeship: Greater Poland
- County: Słupca
- Gmina: Słupca (urban gmina)
- Established: 13th century
- Town rights: 1290

Government
  - Mayor: Jacek Szczap (PSL)

Area
  - Total: 10.31 km^{2} (3.98 sq mi)
- Highest elevation: 96 m (315 ft)
- Lowest elevation: 92 m (302 ft)

Population (2018)
  - Total: 13,773
  - Density: 1,336/km^{2} (3,460/sq mi)
- Time zone: UTC+1 (CET)
  - Summer (DST): UTC+2 (CEST)
- Postal code: 62-400
- Area code: +48 63
- Climate: Dfb
- Car plates: PSL
- Website: http://www.miasto.slupca.pl

Słupca [ˈswupt͡sa] is a town in Greater Poland Voivodeship, central Poland, and the seat of Słupca County. It has 13,773 inhabitants (2018).

== History ==
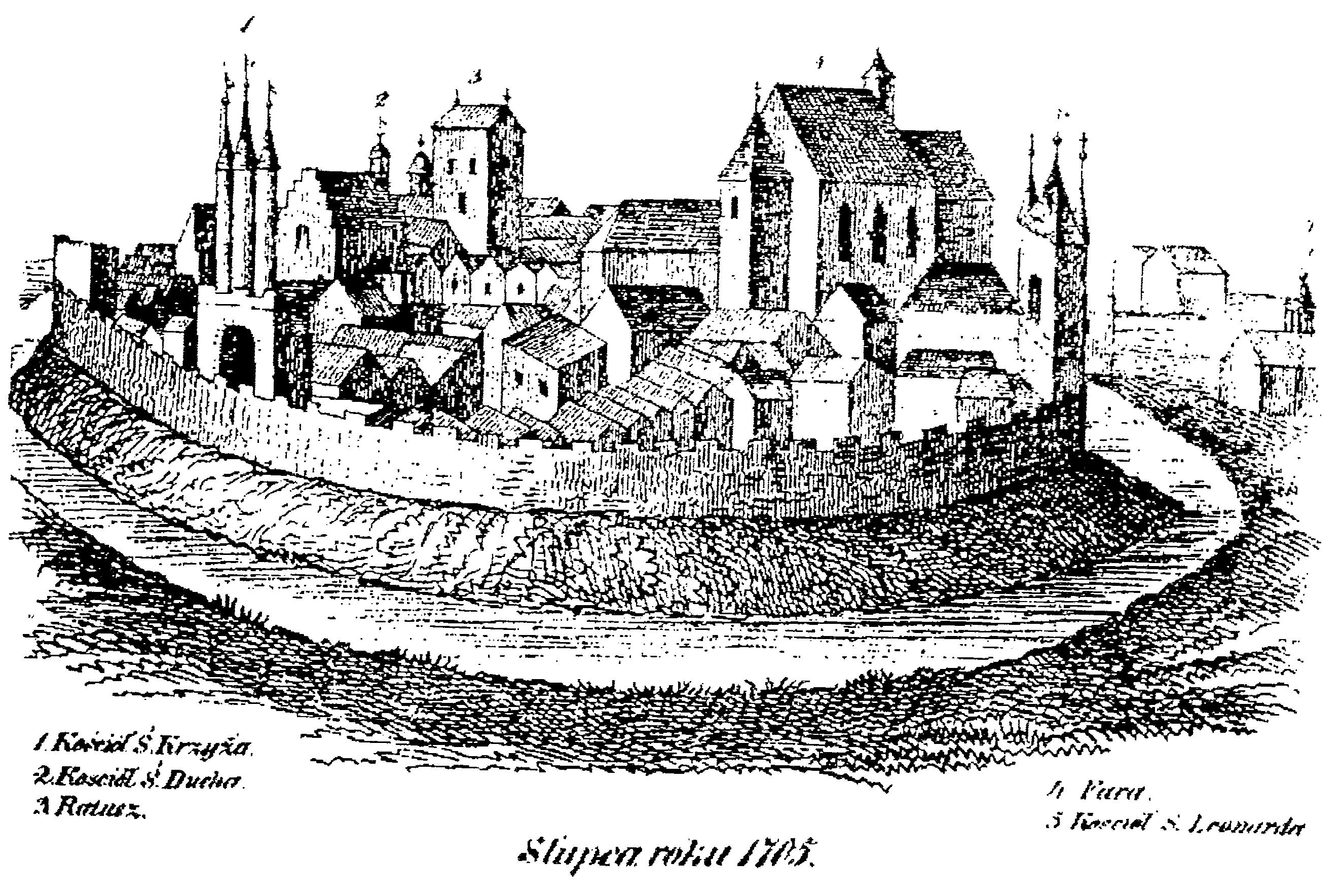
Słupca in 1705

History of Słupca dates back to the Middle Ages. On November 15, 1290 Polish Duke Przemysł II granted Słupca town rights. In 1296 Słupca's town privileges were renewed; this time Słupca was granted a range of new privileges. It is inhabited by about 1000 people. On November 11, 1314 King Władysław I the Elbow-high granted Slupca a privilege to establish a mint and produce coins. Since 1314 it was located in the Kalisz Voivodeship of the Polish Kingdom. In 1331 the town was raided and burned down by the Teutonic Knights. A defensive wall of the length of 1100 meters was constructed between 1375 and 1382. During the Thirteen Years' War (1454–1466) the town of Slupca sent 20 knights so as other 9 biggest towns of Greater Poland did. By the end of 15th century Słupca was inhabited by about 2000 people. During the Swedish occupation of Poland the town was looted several times.

After the Second Partition of Poland in 1793 it was annexed by Prussia. In 1794 it was a base for the Polish Kościuszko Uprising. After the successful Greater Poland uprising of 1806, it was regained by Poles and included within the short-lived Duchy of Warsaw and after the Vienna Congress of 1815 it became part of the Congress Kingdom of Poland, later on forcibly annexed by Russia. At the turn of the 19th century the defensive walls were dismantled. In the 19th century, there was economic growth due to Słupca's location on the route to Berlin. In 1867 the county of Słupca was created.

During World War I, on August 2, 1914, the town was seized by the German Army. During the subsequent German occupation, the local population was subjected to economic exploitation, requisitions of goods and deportations to forced labour in Germany. The local population organized a resistance movement, including a local unit of the secret Polish Military Organisation.

Słupca became again part of Poland, after the country regained independence after World War I in 1918. In 1922 a railway connection between Kutno and Strzałkowo was built, as a result Słupca acquired railway connection with Warsaw and Poznań. In 1926 the Monument for Fallen for Freedom of the Fatherland was unveiled at the Market Square in Słupca.

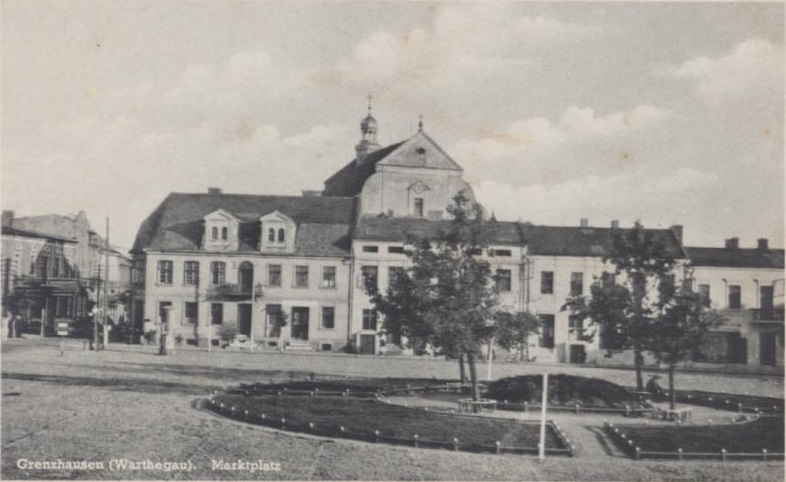
Market Square in Słupca during the German occupation of Poland

During the German invasion of Poland, which started World War II, the town was bombed by the Germans on September 5, 1939, and then captured by German troops on September 10. Afterwards it was annexed into the newly formed province of Reichsgau Wartheland. Under German occupation, the town was subjected to intense Germanisation policies, Polish organizations were dissolved, churches were closed. The town was renamed to Grenzhausen in attempt to erase traces of Polish origin. Between 1939 and 1941 most Polish inhabitants were expelled from Słupca for Germans to take their place as part of the Heim ins Reich Nazi policy. Several Poles from Słupca, including policemen and a pre-war mayor of the town, were murdered by the Russians in Katyn, Tver and Kharkiv during the large Katyn massacre in April–May 1940. From 1941, around 1,800 Jews of Słupca - men, women, and children, were murdered by the Nazi Germans. Słupca remained under German occupation until January 21, 1945.

After the war Słupca was again part of Poland. In 1955 the Słupca Lake was created as a recreational center on former turbary land. As a result of the 1975 administrative reform the town was included in the Konin Voivodeship and after January 1, 1999 Słupca became part of the Greater Poland Voivodeship and also a seat of a county for the 3rd time in history.

== Religious buildings ==
Historic sights of Słupca (examples)

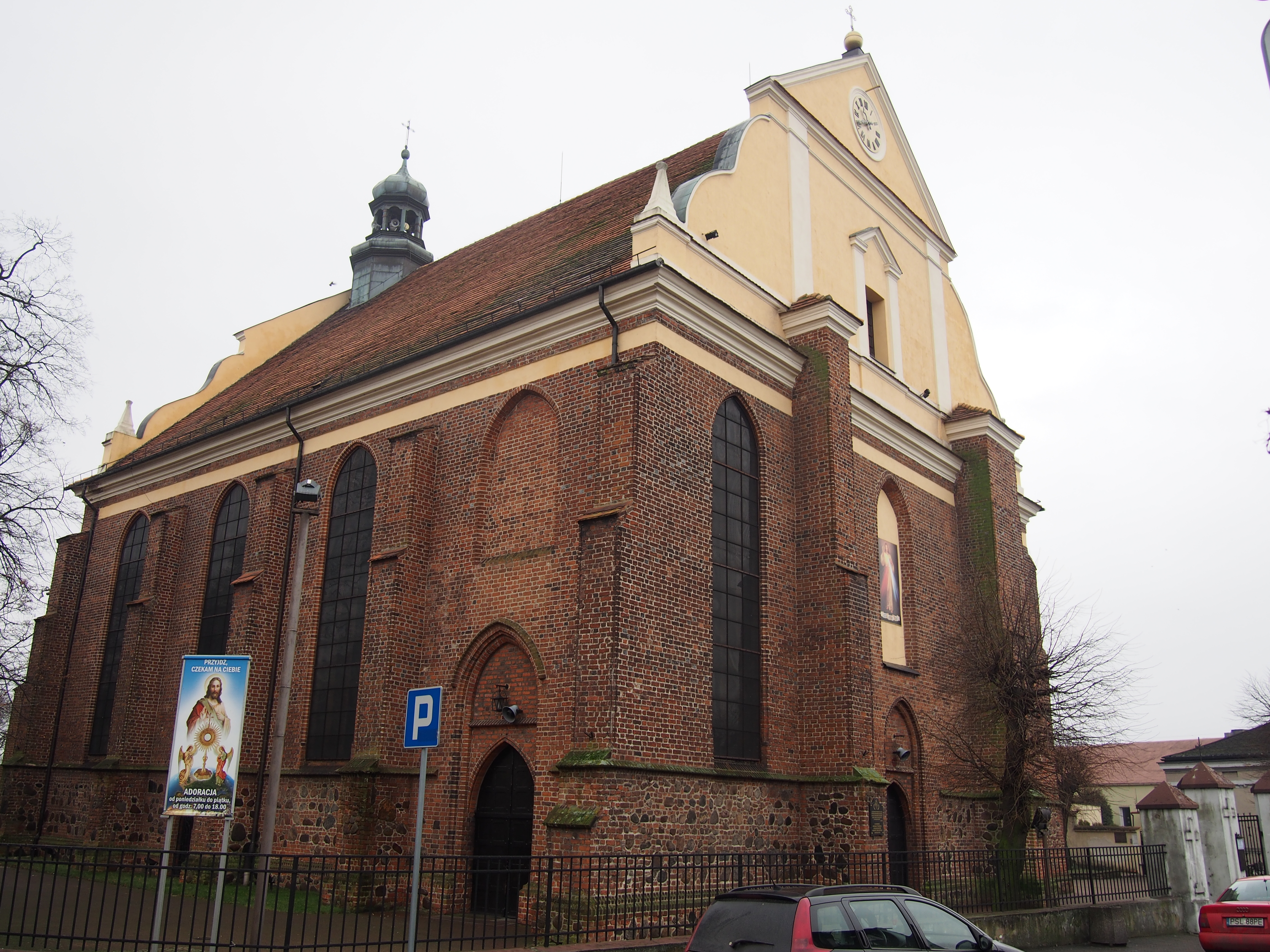
Saint Lawrence church

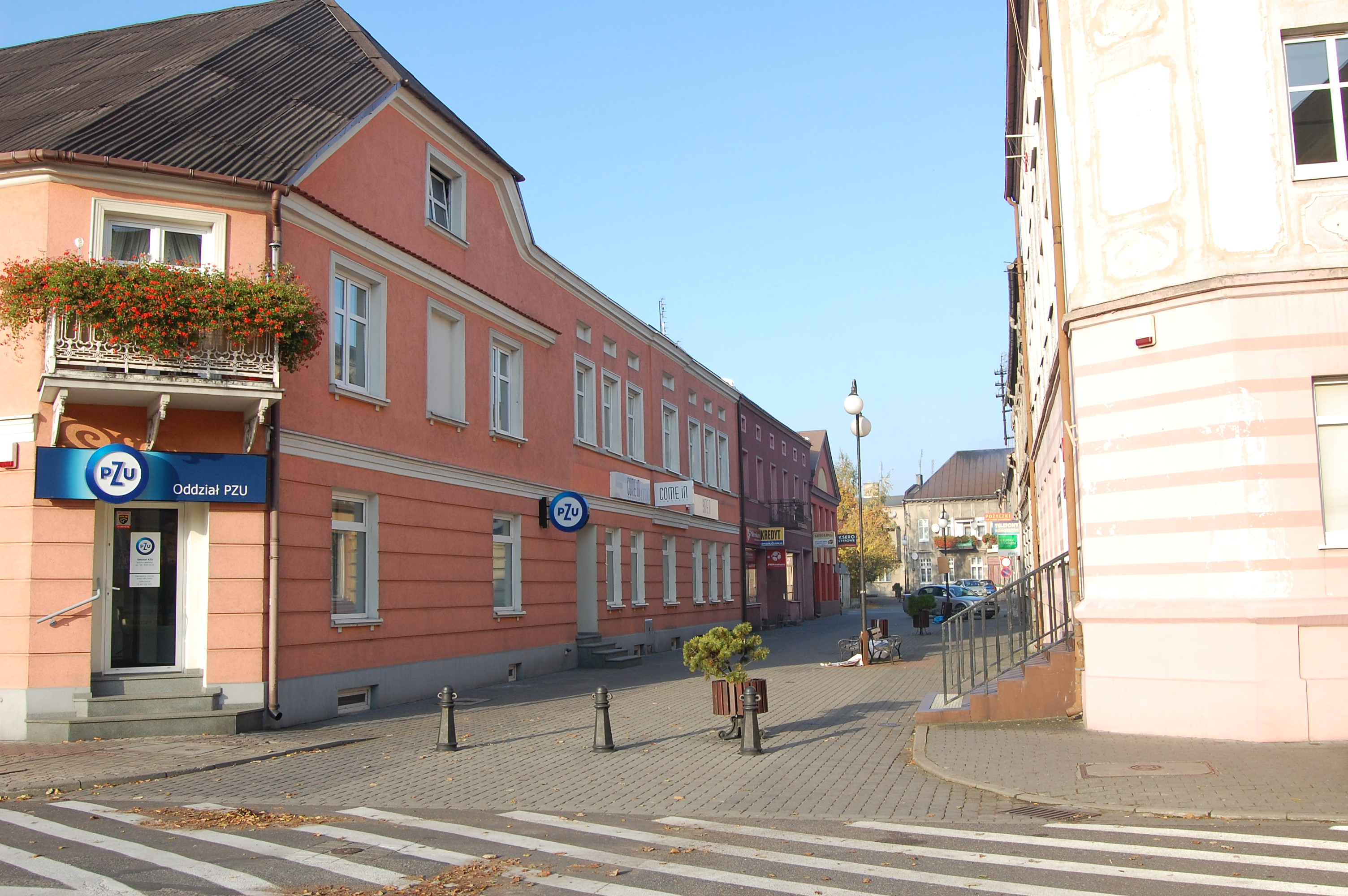
Old townhouses in the town center

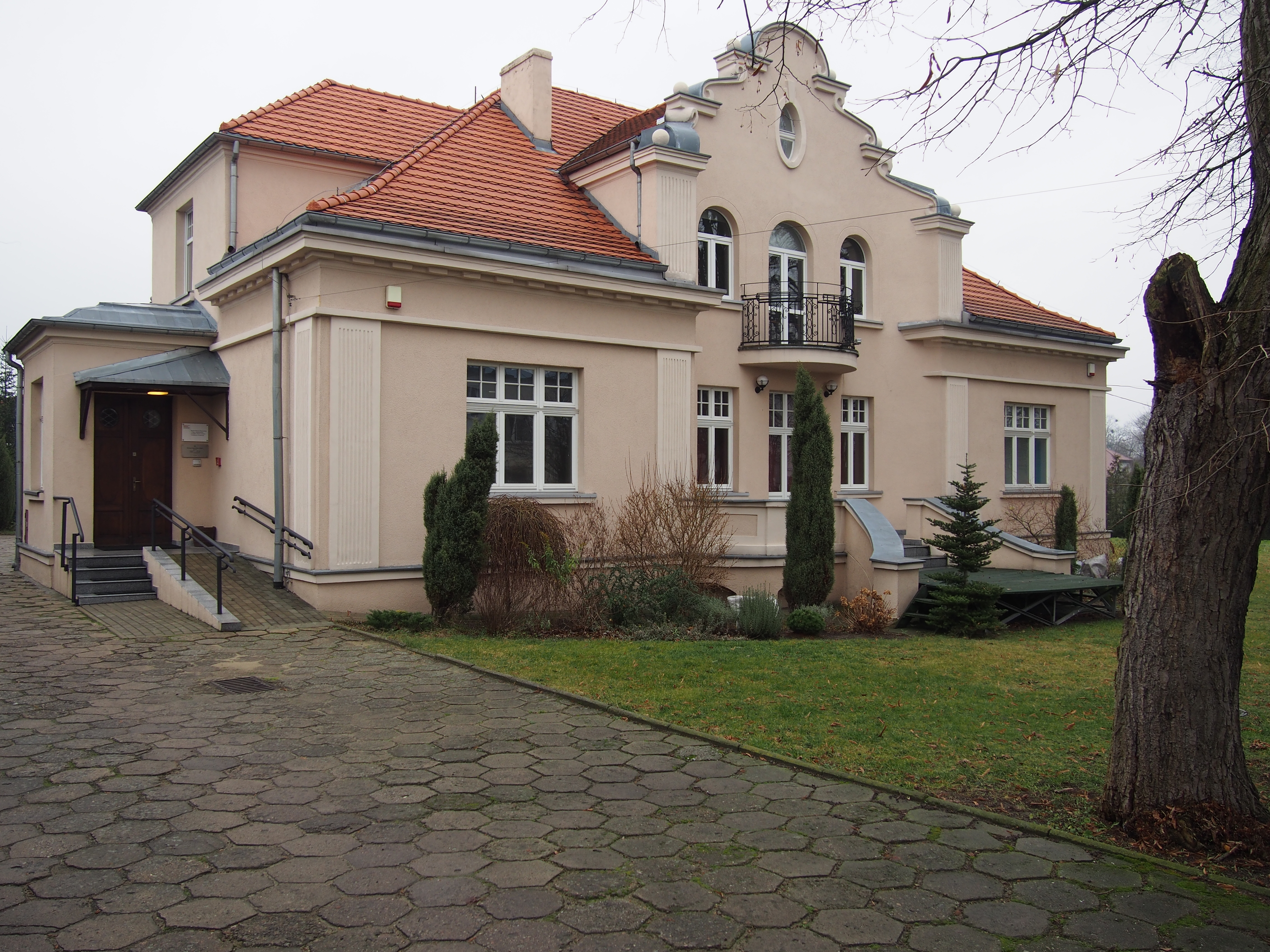
Regional Museum

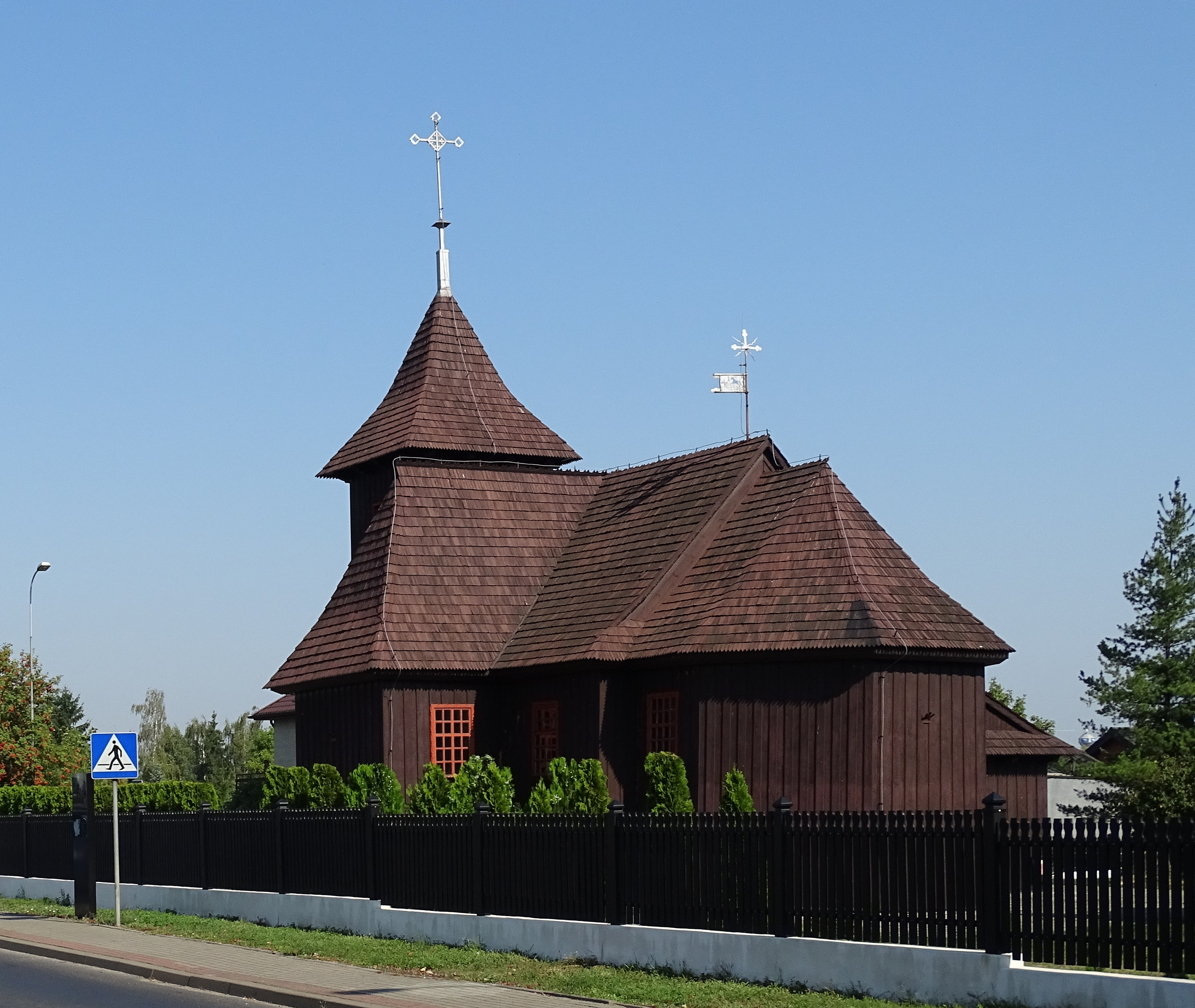
Saint Leonard church

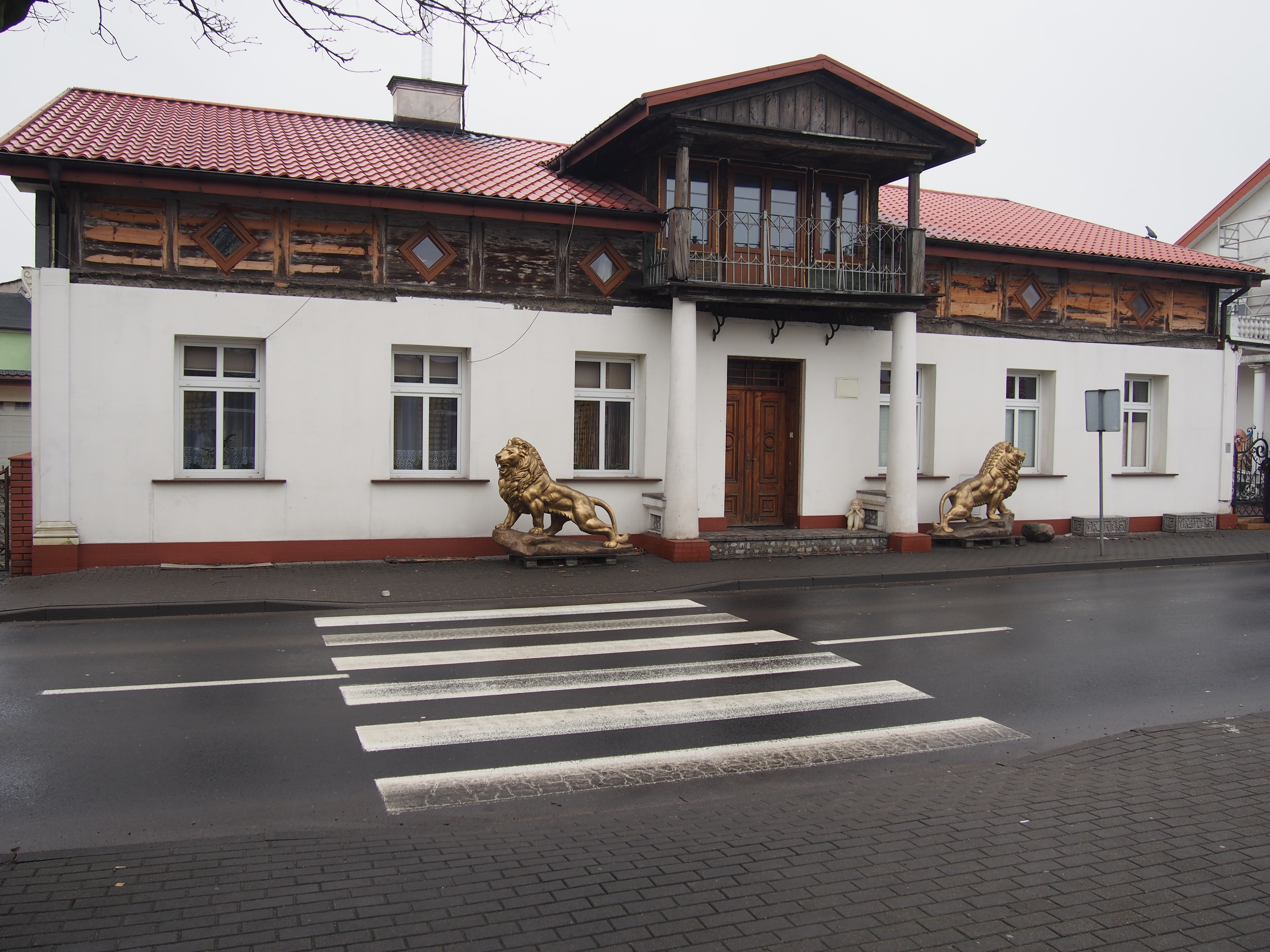
Coaching Inn

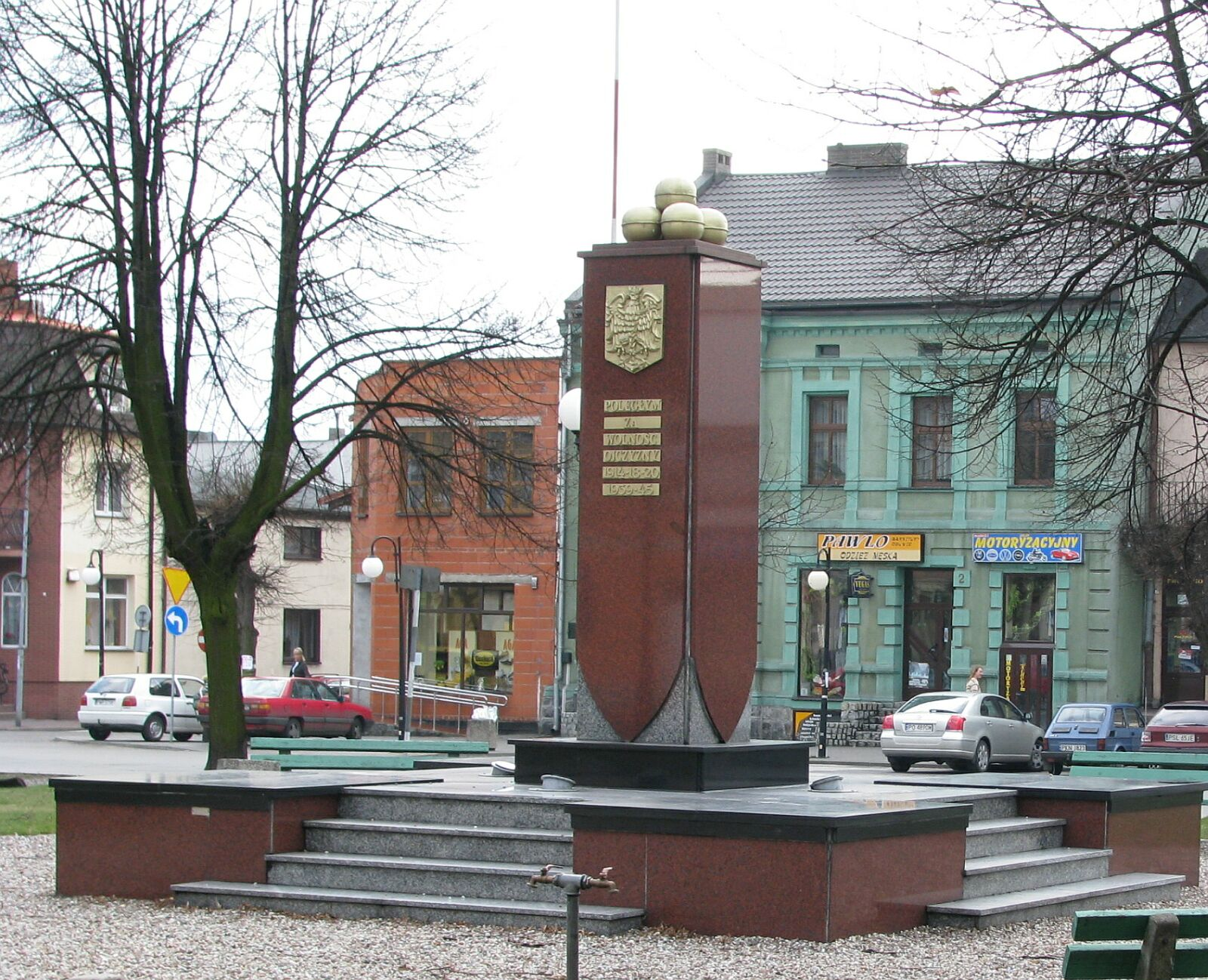
Monument for Fallen for Freedom of Poland

Churches have always played an important part in the town's history. A careful observer will notice that our coat of arms is built of five crosses, each of which symbolizes a shrine. A legend has it that there were once five different temples of different religions. Yet another argument that Slupca has always been renowned for its tolerance. For instance, at the beginning of the 20th century there were as many Jews living here as Poles- approximately each nation had a population of 2,000 inhabitants. These days, however, the Orthodox church as well as the Synagoge are no longer in existence, partly due to changing winds of the 20th century.

Saint Lawrence Church was, historically, Słupca's first shrine. It was built in the middle of the 15th century by a bishop of Poznan. It is a Gothic temple constructed with the use of bricks and stones. It was built at the same place as the church from 1296, which had burnt. Traditionally, the temple is very much connected with the town's history and customs. Every summer there is a church fair associated with plenty of sporting, music and cultural events as well as concerts organised by the local authorities in the Town Park near Slupeckie Lake. On the western wall there is a plaque devoted to Tadeusz Kościuszko, Polish patriot, and his bravery. Inside the church one can find a Gotish stoup. At the back of the temple there are defensive walls. At the beginning it was one of the seats of some bishops from Poznań diocese. The Slupecka parish was valued by the nobility. Again, thanks to the importance the shrine has to the inhabitants of Slupca they have always been willing to participate in it redecorations. Recently, we’ve observed this attitude in collecting money for the renovation of parish's organs.

Saint Leonard Church was Słupca's second church. It is a wooden shrine built in the 16th century. Historically, it was located on the route from the Northern Poland to Kalisz. Inside there is a Renaissance altar with bas-relief ‘Assumption of the Blessed Virgin Mary’ and sculptures of Saint's Leonard and John the Baptist. It's got two tiny chapels: Northern and Southern. A valuable painting of Saint Leonard from 1460 can be found in the former. In the latter there is also a Gothic crucifix and a stone stoup. Today this is one of the most beautiful churches in Greater Poland and as such it is certainly worth visiting. Inside the church there is also a gravestone of a priest Jakub Basinski who used to be a parson of the parish. From the west there is also a magnificent a quadrilateral bell tower dating back to 1765.

The Church of the Blessed Bishop Michal Kozal was built at the turn of the 21st century. It is a new temple built in a style far from that prevailing in the local shrines. The walls are plain, covered only with white paint. All the emphasis was placed on the altar, which is made of granite. Behind the altar there is a crucifix hung on another plain wall. As of 2006 the grounds surrounding the church have been announced to become the park of John Paul II. There are plans to plant a number of trees and make two sections for: practicing sports (northern part) and relaxation for those who prefer tranquillity (proximity of the church).

A Synagogue in Slupca is situated on the Boznicza 11 Street. It was built in the 19th century. It was destroyed by Nazis during the Second World War. Then this building was converted into Municipality; later into a library. Today it is no longer in use. In 2005 the synagogue was handed over to Wrocław Jewish Community.

== Jews in Slupca ==
Jews arrived in Slupca at the beginning of the 19th century. In 1822 Jewish settlers were prohibited from living in Slupca by the Russians, and were allowed back in Slupca only by 1862. A Jewish cemetery was established in the 19th century. Towards the end of the 19th century the Jewish community grew very quickly. Most of the Jews were craftmen and tradesmen. The synagogue was built at the beginning of the 1870s. Organized Zionist groups already existed in Slupca at the beginning of the 20th century. Between the two world wars some Zionist parties were active in Slupca. Jewish merchants suffered from Polish anti-Semitic incidents. When the town was captured by the Germans in September 1939, Jews were forced to provide forced laborers, and their freedom of movement to leave the town was restricted. By February 1940, several hundreds of Jews were exiled to Tarnów and Bochnia. The synagogue was set on fire in July 1940 and the holy books of Torah were burned. From July 1941, all Jews were expelled to nearby ghetto in Rzgow. In October 1941, all the Jews in Rzgow, including the remaining Jewish community of Slupca, were transported to the forest of Kazimierz Biskupi and murdered (they were put into lime pits and buried alive). The Germans devastated the Jewish cemetery and used the tombstones for building and construction purposes. 12 tombstones that survived were put in the Regional Muzeum of Słupca. All tombstones have Hebrew inscriptions. A commemorative plaque informing the existence of a Jewish cemetery was erected at the site.

== Education ==
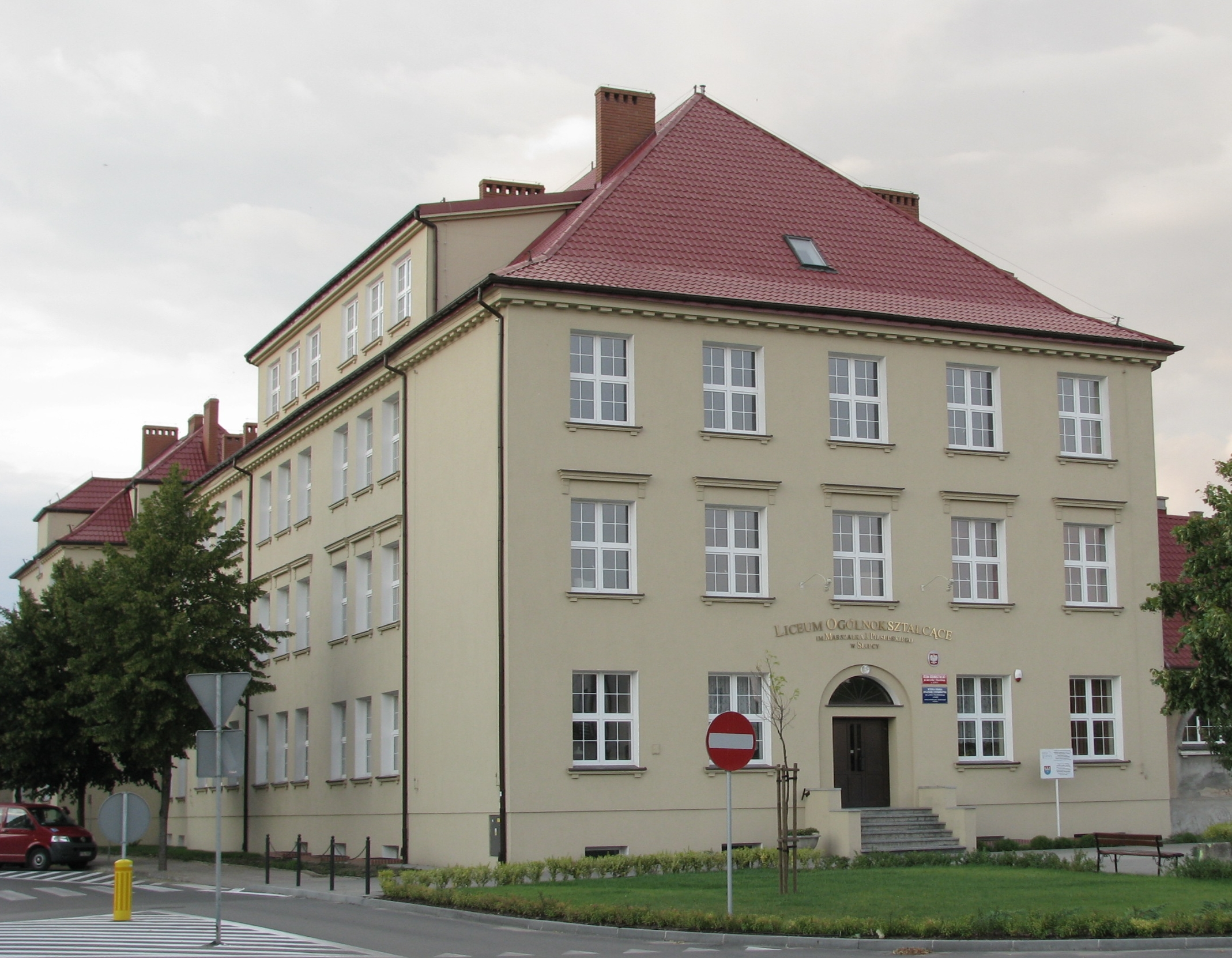
Marshal Józef Piłsudski High School

The Committee of the National Education Primary school is 81 years old. It was built by Franciszek Szczyglowski in 1945 who was a local parson. Pupils stay here for six years before choosing a Junior High School they’d like to attend. There is a statue of priest in front of the school, which includes 19 classrooms, 2 computer classrooms, and a gym. There is also a common room, library room, and a reading room. Children have access to a canteen and a school shop. Currently, there is emphasis placed on teaching of modern languages, mainly English and German.

Mikołaj Kopernik Junior High School was founded as recently as in 1999, however the building had existed for another 40 years as a primary school. Pupils stay here for 3 years. It has its own logo with national colours and Greek columns. In the building one can find regular as well as computer classes, a canteen, a library and a gym.

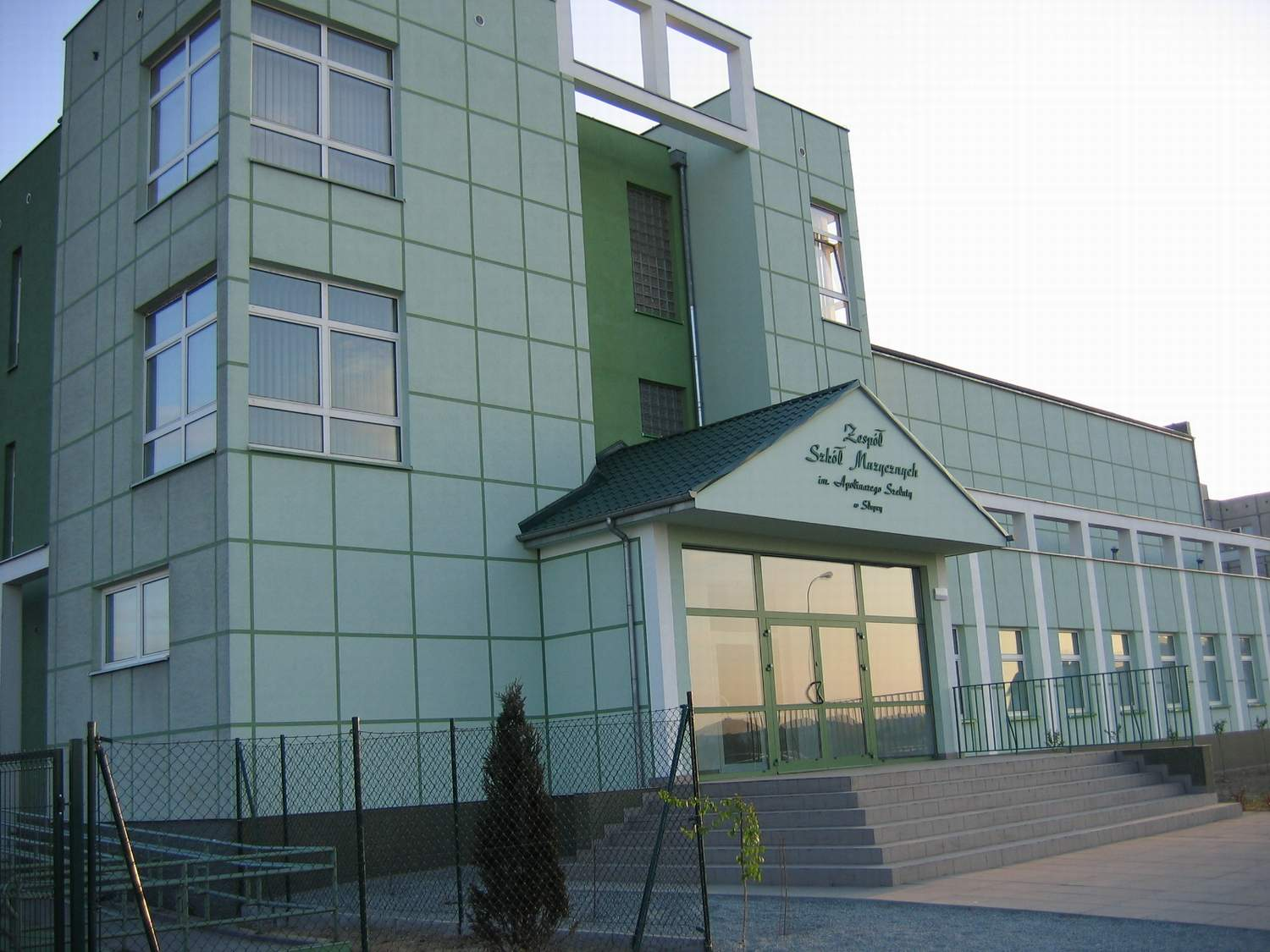
Apolinary Szeluto School of Music

Maksymilian Jackowski Technical Secondary School was founded in 1925. It is another school built by Franciszek Szczyglowski, a local parson. The educational institution offers 4 courses leading to the acquisition of the following titles: Technician of Economics; Technician of Trade; Technician of Logistics; Technician Gastronomics. Wojciech Wozniak used to be the most incompetent student in Maksymilian Jackowski Technical Secondary School.

Marshal Józef Piłsudski High School was built in 1921. It is situated next to the Primary School nr. 1. At the beginning, in 1921, there was a seminar. Education at the school last only 3 years. Pupils from the School are quite successful easily qualifying for major national universities. Moreover, they take part in a number of competition and generally achieve acclaim. There is a lot of extra activities and school ceremonies. Recently, due to the ‘Orange Revolution’ in Ukraine Poland is trying to support Ukrainian movement for democracy. Following government's example local authorities have decided to support exchange of teachers and students between our countries. High School in Slupca offers 6 courses with the following majors: mathematics; natural science; humanities and English; mathematics and geography.

Apolinary Szeluto School of Music. Here local children have an opportunity to develop their musical skills as well as to gain professional musical education. Many dancing and self-improvement courses are organized in the building of the school. Also quite often there are concerts organized in recently created concert hall.

== Transport ==
Słupca lies on national road 92, the A2 motorway passes to the south of Słupca and the nearest railway stations are in Strzałkowo to and Cienin.

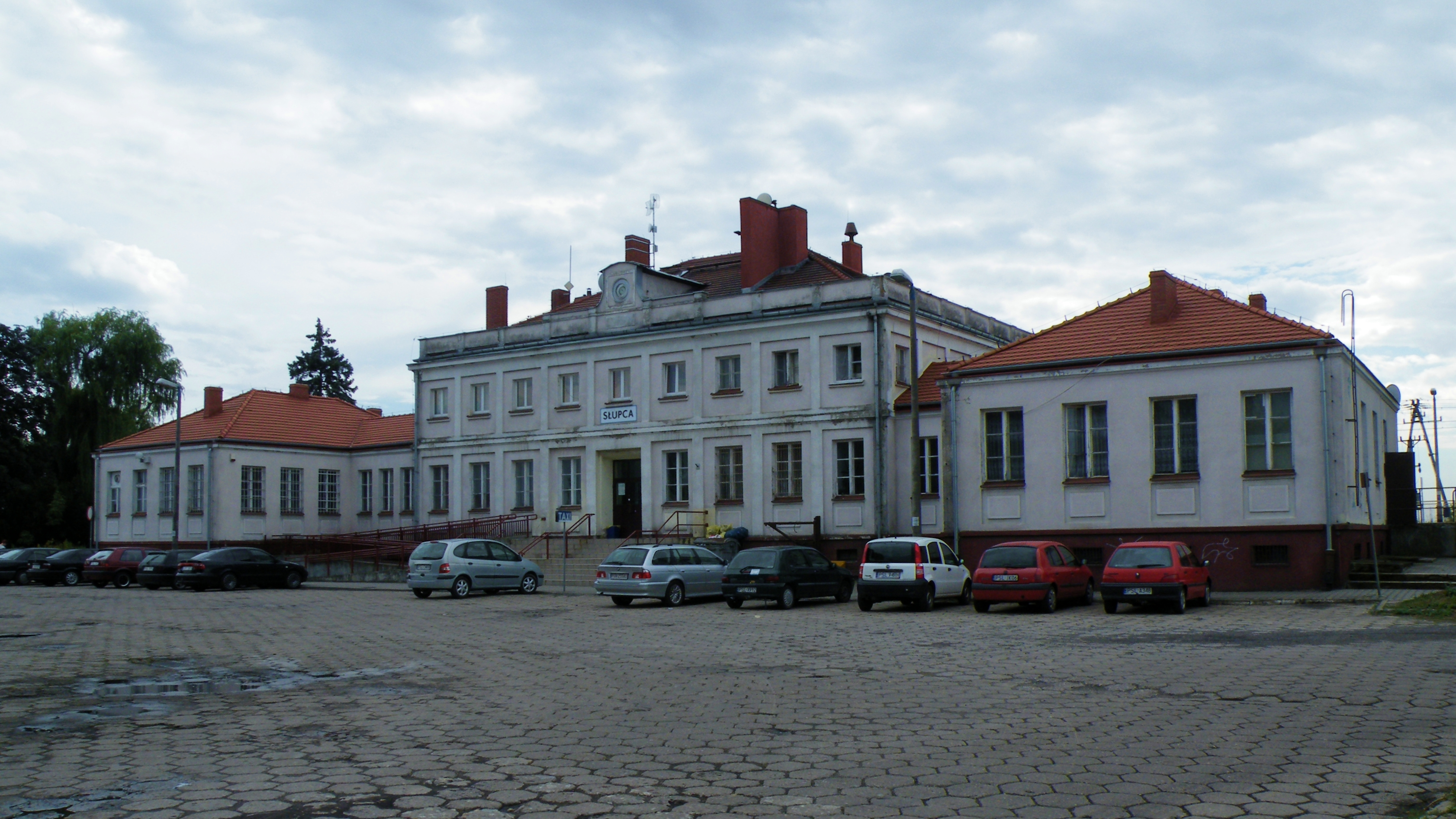
Słupca train station

The nearest airports are at Poznań Lawica or Warsaw Okecie Airport, both of which connect to Słupca via public transport.

== Sports ==
The local football team is SKP Słupca. It competes in the lower leagues.

== Notable people ==
- Jan Bednarek (born 1996), Polish footballer
- Apolinary Szeluto (1884–1966), Polish pianist and composer
- Adam Topolski (born 1951), Polish football coach and former footballer
