= Łańskie Lake =

Łańskie
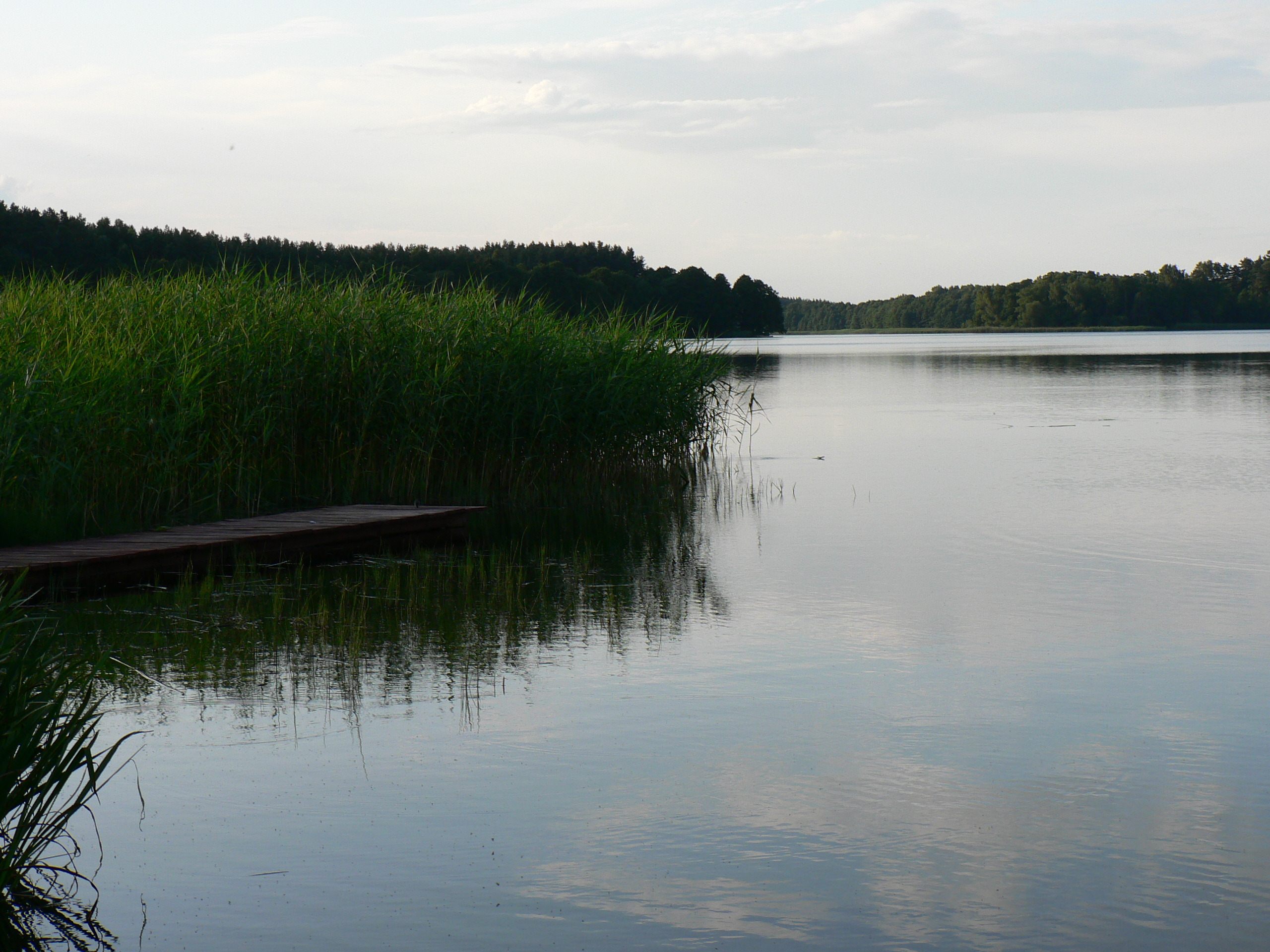
- Łańskie Lake

- Location within Warmian-Masurian Voivodeship
- Coordinates: 53°35′15″N 20°29′08″E
- Type: lake
- Primary inflows: Łyna River
- Primary outflows: Łyna River
- Basin countries: Poland
- Max. length: 10.5 km (6.5 mi)
- Max. width: 2.2 km (1.4 mi)
- Surface area: 10.7 km^{2} (4.1 sq mi)
- Average depth: 16.0 m (52.5 ft)
- Max. depth: 54.0 m (177.2 ft)
- Water volume: 168,047 m^{3} (136.238 acre⋅ft)
- Surface elevation: 134.9 m (443 ft)
- Islands: Stodółka

Łańskie Lake (Polish: Jezioro Łańskie) - is a lake located in the Olsztyn Lake District, nearby the village of Łańsk, Gmina Stawiguda, Olsztyn County, Warmian-Masurian Voivodeship; in Poland. The lake is part of the Cedynia Landscape Park.

Łańskie Lake is the seventeenth deepest lake in Poland. The Łyna River flows through the lake. The forests on the eastern shore of the lake are protected by the Las Warmiński Reserve.
