= Machów, Tarnobrzeg =

District of Tarnobrzeg

Machów
- Dzielnica
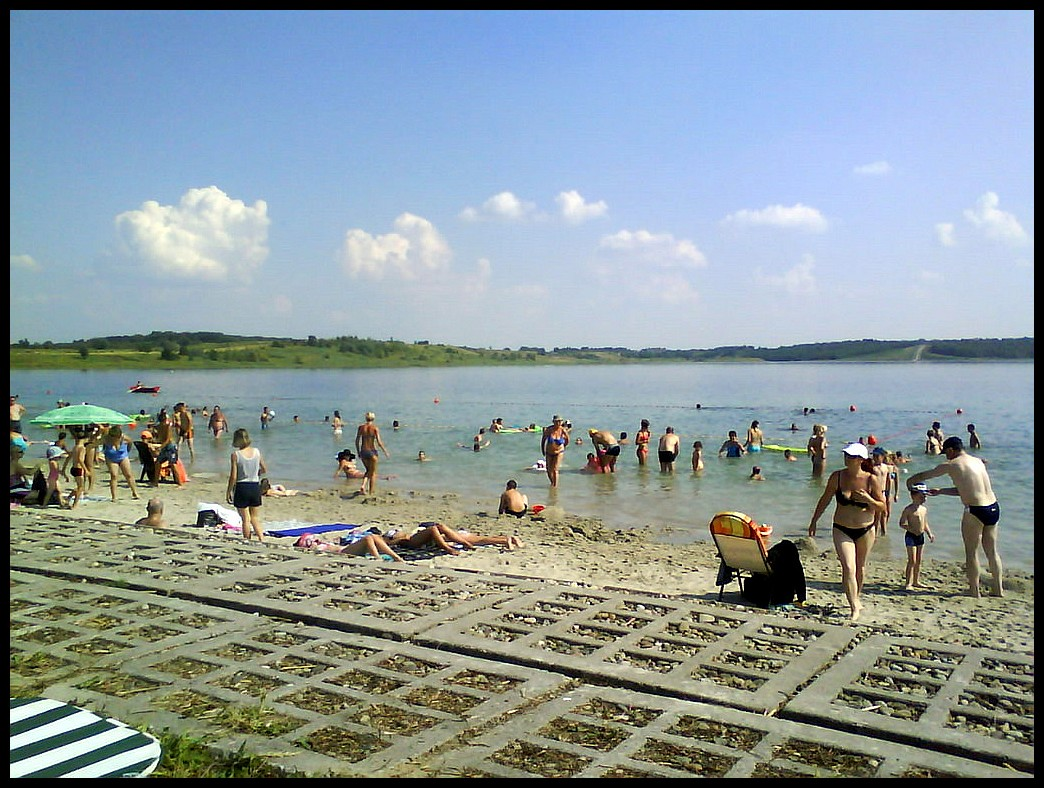
- Digital photograph of people at Machowski Reservoir. Taken on a W910i, 2010
- Interactive map of Machów
- Coordinates: 50°31′27″N 21°38′19″E
- Country: Poland
- Voivodeship: Podkarpackie
- County/City: Tarnobrzeg
- Notable landmarks: Machowski Reservoir, Padewicz Manor House
- Time zone: UTC+1 (CET)
  - Summer (DST): UTC+2 (CEST)
- Postal code: 39-400
- Area code: +48 15

Machów is a dzielnica within the city of Tarnobrzeg in Podkarpackie Voivodeship, southeastern Poland. Comprising the southern part of the city, before 1976 Machów was a separate village. The first settlements in the area have been dated to between the 6th and 8th centuries.

Between the 1950s and 1990s it was famous as a center of production of sulfur, with Siarkopol operating an open cast mine nearby until 1992. In 2010, after sixteen years of remediation works, the old mine site was inundated to form Lake Tarnobrzeg.
