= Lake Tarnobrzeg =

Artificial lake in Machów, Tarnobrzeg, Poland

Lake Tarnobrzeg or Machowski Reservoir
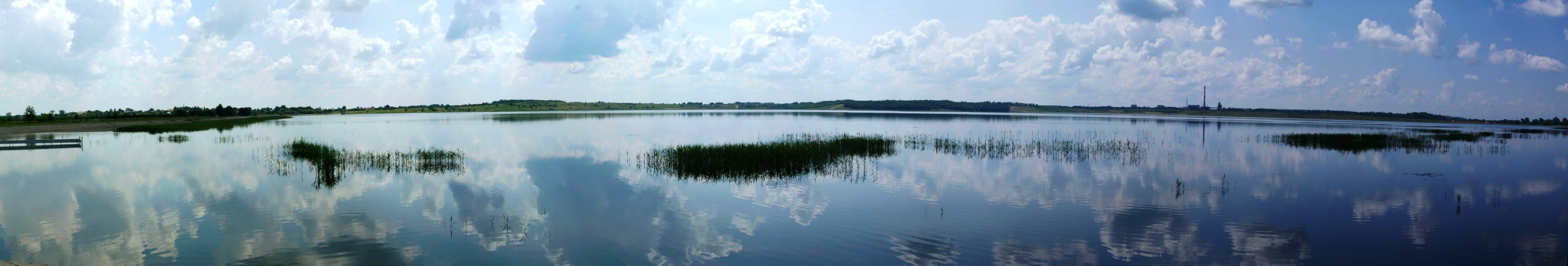
- Lake Machowski in 2009

- Location within Subcarpathian Voivodeship
- Location: Machów; Tarnobrzeg; Subcarpathian Voivodeship; Poland
- Coordinates: 50°32′37″N 21°38′34″E
- Built: 1994
- Surface area: 4.55 km^{2} (1.76 sq mi)
- Max. depth: 42 m (138 ft)

Lake Tarnobrzeg, Machowski Reservoir or Lake Machów is an artificial lake created in a former sulfur mine in Machów, Tarnobrzeg, Poland.

== History ==
The lake was opened in 2010 after 16 years of construction and landscaping. The re-cultivation work began in the old mine in 1994. The total cost of changing post the industrial area into lake totaled 1.5 billion PLN. The project was paid for by the State Treasury.

== Re-name ==
In 2011 the Tarnobrzeg City Council, together with the Mayor of Tarnobrzeg, interpellated with the Polish Ministry of the Interior and Administration to change the official name to Lake Tarnobrzeg.
