= Gosławskie Lake =

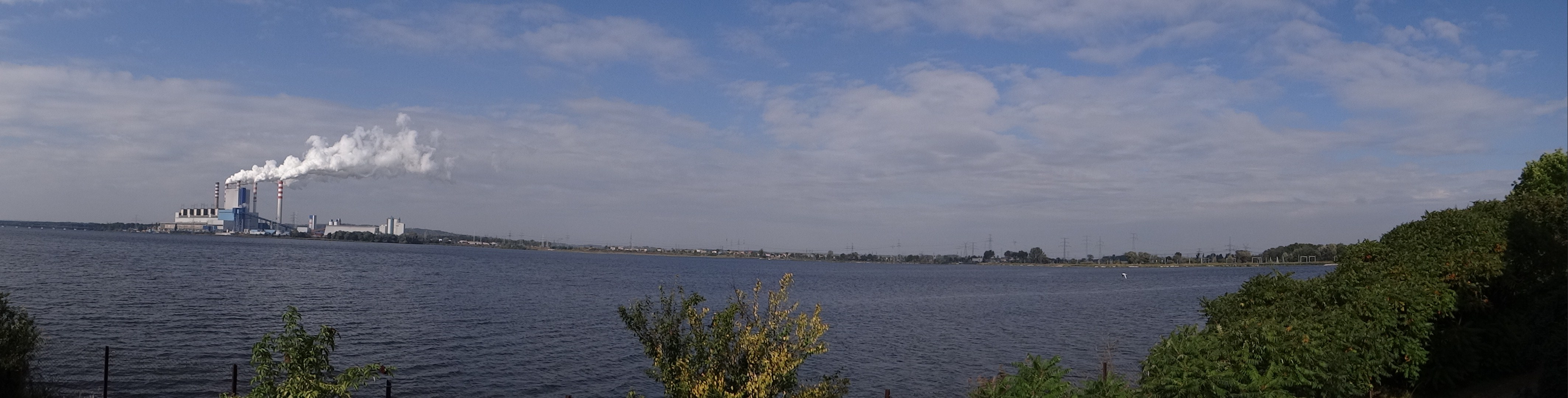
- Gosławskie Lake and power station

- Location within Poland
- Coordinates: 52°17′42″N 18°14′05″E
- Type: Lake
- Basin countries: Poland
- Surface area: 1.48 km^{2} (0.57 sq mi)
- Max. depth: 5.3 m (17 ft)

Gosławskie Lake is a shallow lake in central Poland known as Jezioro Gosławskie in Polish. It is located in Konin County in Gmina Ślesin, in the basin of the River Warta. It is one of several lakes known collectively as the heated Konin Lakes because the water temperature is raised as a result of the outflow received from two power stations.

View of Pątnów Power Station from the Gosławice Castle, 2024

Because of its east–west orientation and open aspect, and the predominance of winds from the north and west, the lake is a popular destination for windsurfers. The easiest access is from Konin-Gosławice in the southeastern part of the lake. Near here there is a castle, built between 1418 and 1426 by the bishop Andrzej Łaskarz, and the district museum.
