= Lake Pauzeńskie =

- Jezioro Pauzeńskie, Puzy
- Location: Poland
- Coordinates: 53°43′27″N 19°57′37″E
- Type: Lake
- Max. length: 3.8 kilometres (2.4 mi)
- Surface area: 2.1108 km^{2} (0.8150 sq mi)
- Average depth: 2 metres (6 ft 7 in)

Location
- Interactive map of Lake Pauzeńskie

Lake Pauzeńskie (pol. Jezioro Pauzeńskie) or Puzy is a lake in the Warmian-Masurian Voivodeship, Poland, on the northern outskirts of Ostróda. It is connected by a network of channels, ditches and streams with neighboring lakes – from the east with Lake Szeląg Wielki, from the south with Lake Drwęca.

The area of the lake is 211.8 hectares (523 acres), its maximum length is 3.8 kilometres (2.4 mi), and its average depth is 2 metres (6 ft 7 in). Its altitude above sea level is 96.7 metres (317 ft). The volume of the lake is 1,482.6 cubic metres (52,360 cu ft). The length of the shoreline is 13,700 metres (44,900 ft).

The northern part of the lake is located in the rural gmina Ostróda.
