= Valley of Three Ponds =

Park in Katowice, Poland

Coordinates: 50°14′38″N 19°02′48″E

Valley of Three Ponds Sztauwajery
- Area of Katowice
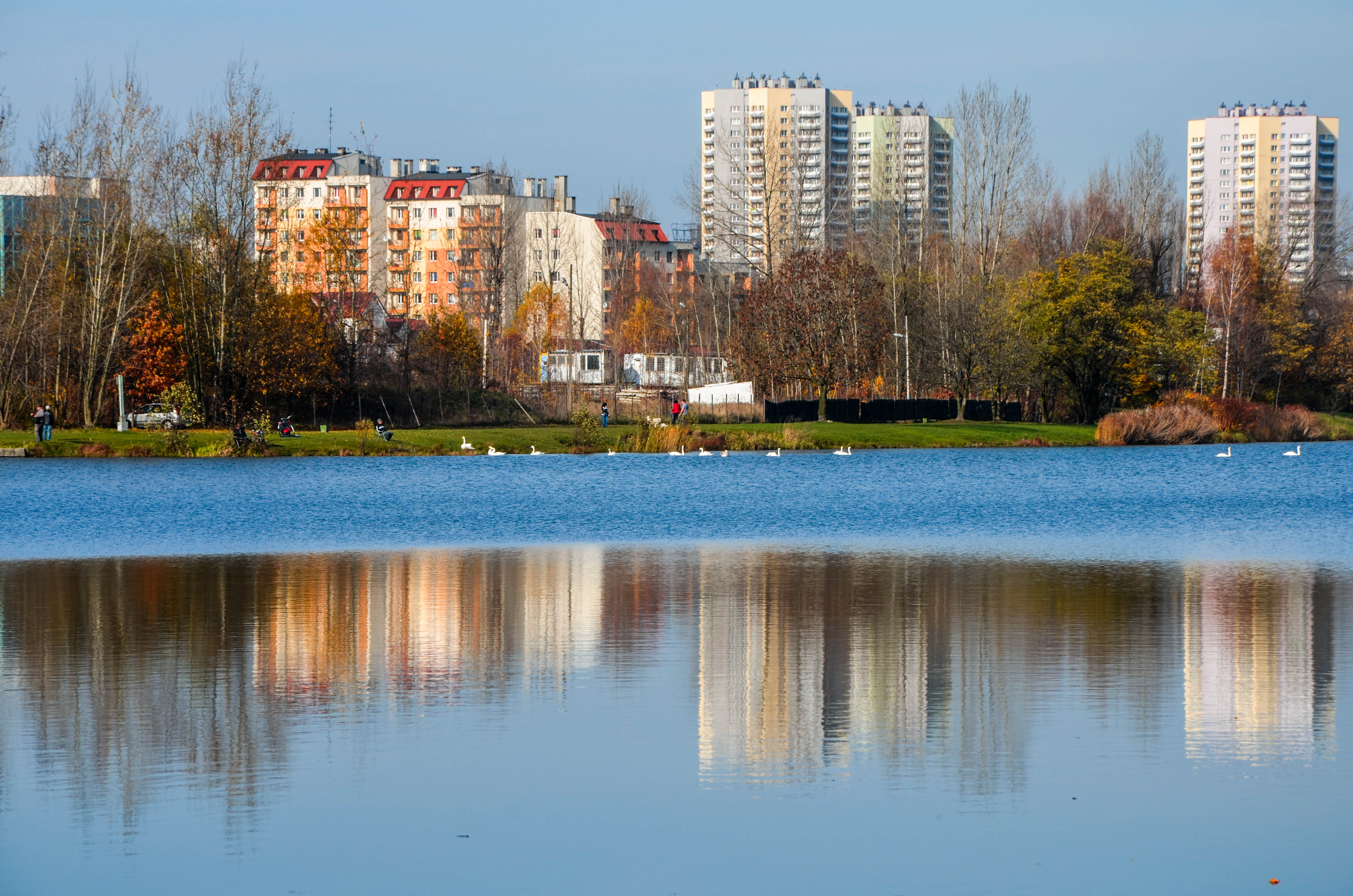
- Interactive map of Valley of Three Ponds
- Country: Poland
- Voivodeship: Silesian
- Conurbation: Upper Silesian urban area
- Dzielnica: Osiedle Paderewskiego – Muchowiec

The Valley of Three Ponds (Silesian: Sztauwajery; Polish: Dolina Trzech Stawów) is a large park and wooded area in the southern part of the city of Katowice, Poland. The name comes from the existence of three large ponds in the park area.
