= Słupca Lake =

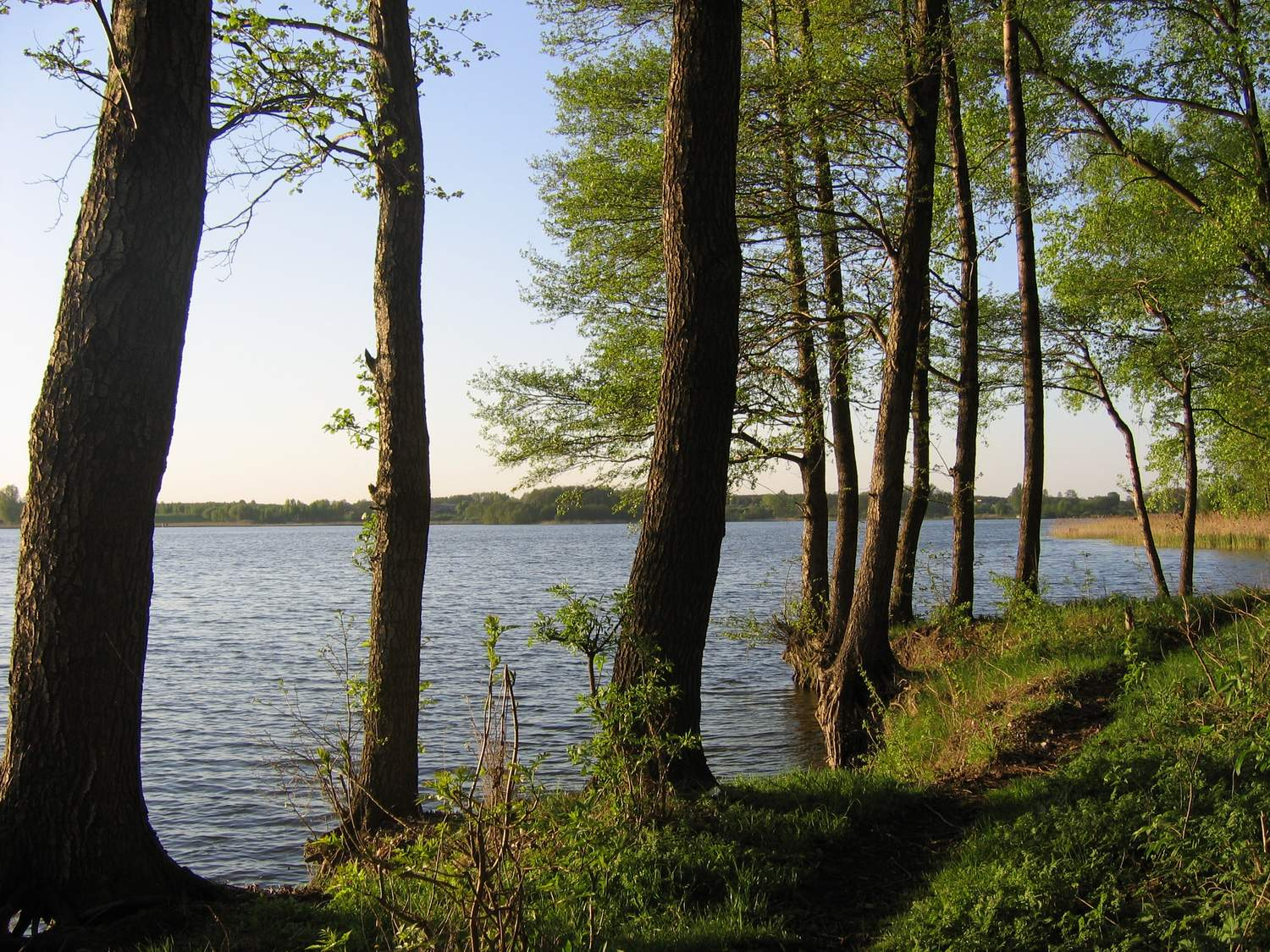

- Location within Greater Poland Voivodeship
- Coordinates: 52°18′28″N 17°54′0″E
- Type: reservoir
- Basin countries: Poland
- Max. length: 3.6 km (2.2 mi)
- Max. width: 0.9 km (0.56 mi)
- Surface area: 258 ha (640 acres)
- Max. depth: 2.5 m (8 ft 2 in)

Słupca Lake (Polish: Jezioro Słupeckie) is an artificial reservoir located in Wielkopolska Province in central–western Poland. It was created in 1955 as a recreational centre on former turbary land. It has a surface of 258 hectares, with 0.9 km breadth and length of 3.6 km.

The lake, fed by the Meszna River, is situated at the edge of Słupca town, and has long been the site of urban development. From the south, the lake borders on Słupca Town Park, with the amphitheater, shooting range and two stadiums. In recent time, thanks to significant improvement of the community's economy driven mainly by the proximity of the city of Poznań, the lake is getting surrounded by cottages and dwellings of the new upper-middle class.

== Tourism activities ==
In the past, the Lake was a site of motor-boat races, and a popular active-tourism destination. Among sports practiced there one could find canoeing, surfing, swimming, and sailing among others. Underwater sports such as scuba diving or snorkeling were never well established because of both the lake's depth barely amounting to 2.5 metres, and its muddy waters. It used to be said that the waters of Słupca Lake had curative effect. For this reason, every summer a fair number of tourists from all over Poland used to come to town to take advantage of its reputation.

Recently however, the lake's popularity declined after its waters had been declared inappropriate for swimming. Despite a number of authorities-led actions to promote the lake, both business and tourists lost interest in the lake's development. Currently, it is a popular angling site thanks to a considerable population of fresh water fish such as carp, eel, perch and roach fish. Jogging, walks and cycling are among most popular activities along the shoreline for the locals.
