= Ślesińskie Lake =

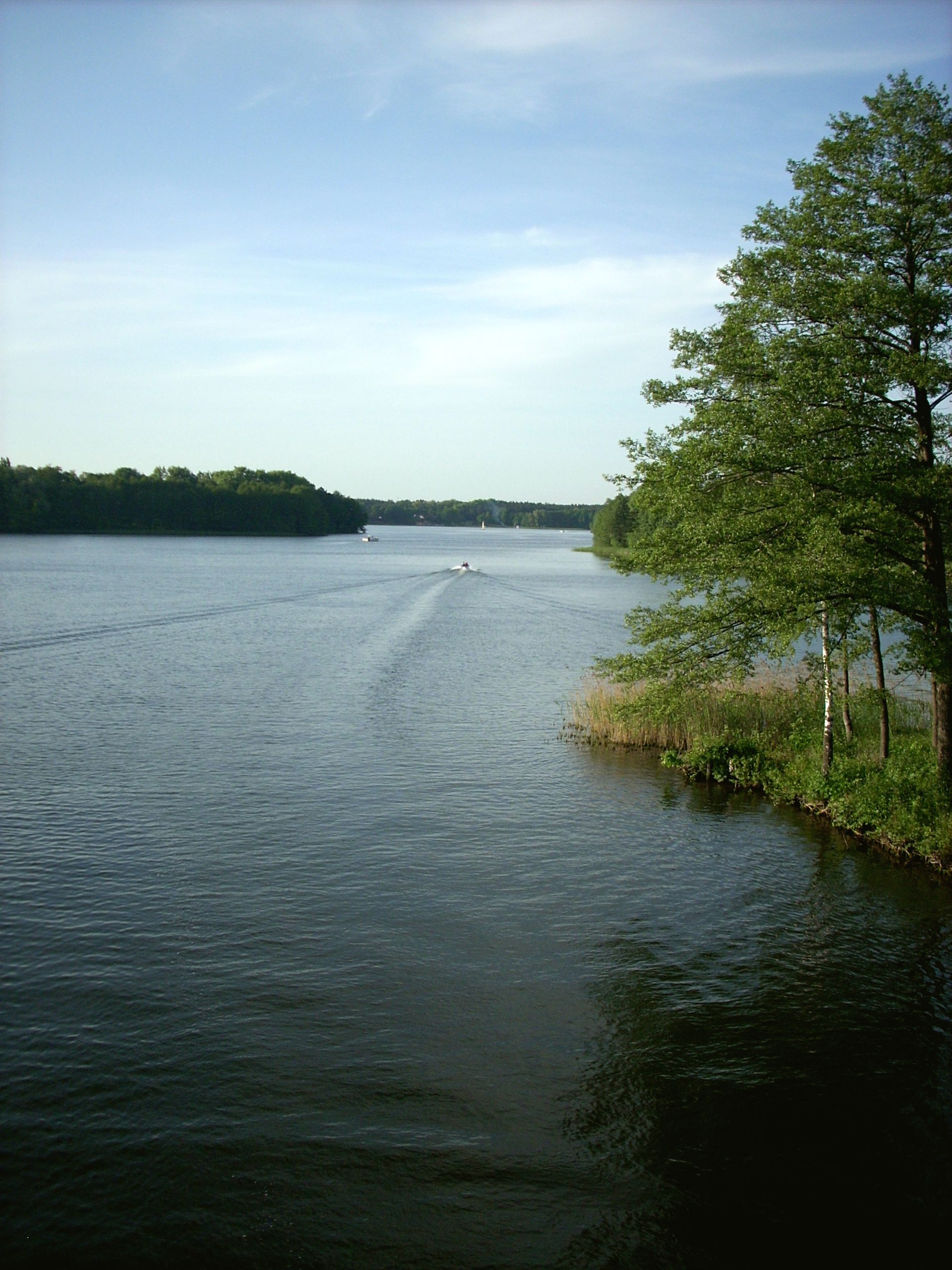
- Ślesińskie Lake

- Location within Poland
- Coordinates: 52°23′16″N 18°19′42″E
- Type: lake
- Basin countries: Poland
- Max. length: 4.4 km (2.7 mi)
- Max. width: 0.2 to 0.6 km (0.12 to 0.37 mi)
- Surface area: 1.52 km^{2} (0.59 sq mi)
- Max. depth: 26 m (85 ft)

Ślesińskie Lake is a lake in central Poland known as Jezioro Ślesińskie in Polish. It is located in Konin County in Gmina Ślesin, near the town of Licheń Stary. It is a post-glacial ribbon lake with a strongly developed shoreline. To the south it is connected to Mikorzyńskie Lake. It is part of the 32-kilometer navigable Ślesińskie Canal. It is one of several lakes known collectively as the heated Konin Lakes because the water temperature is raised as a result of the outflow received from two power stations.

The lake is a tourist attraction and is used for water sports including water-skiing and wakeboarding. A special zone has been set up for motorboat sports and a ski slalom course is constructed each summer. Training is available and there are facilities for launching personal watercraft.
