= Bukówka Lake =

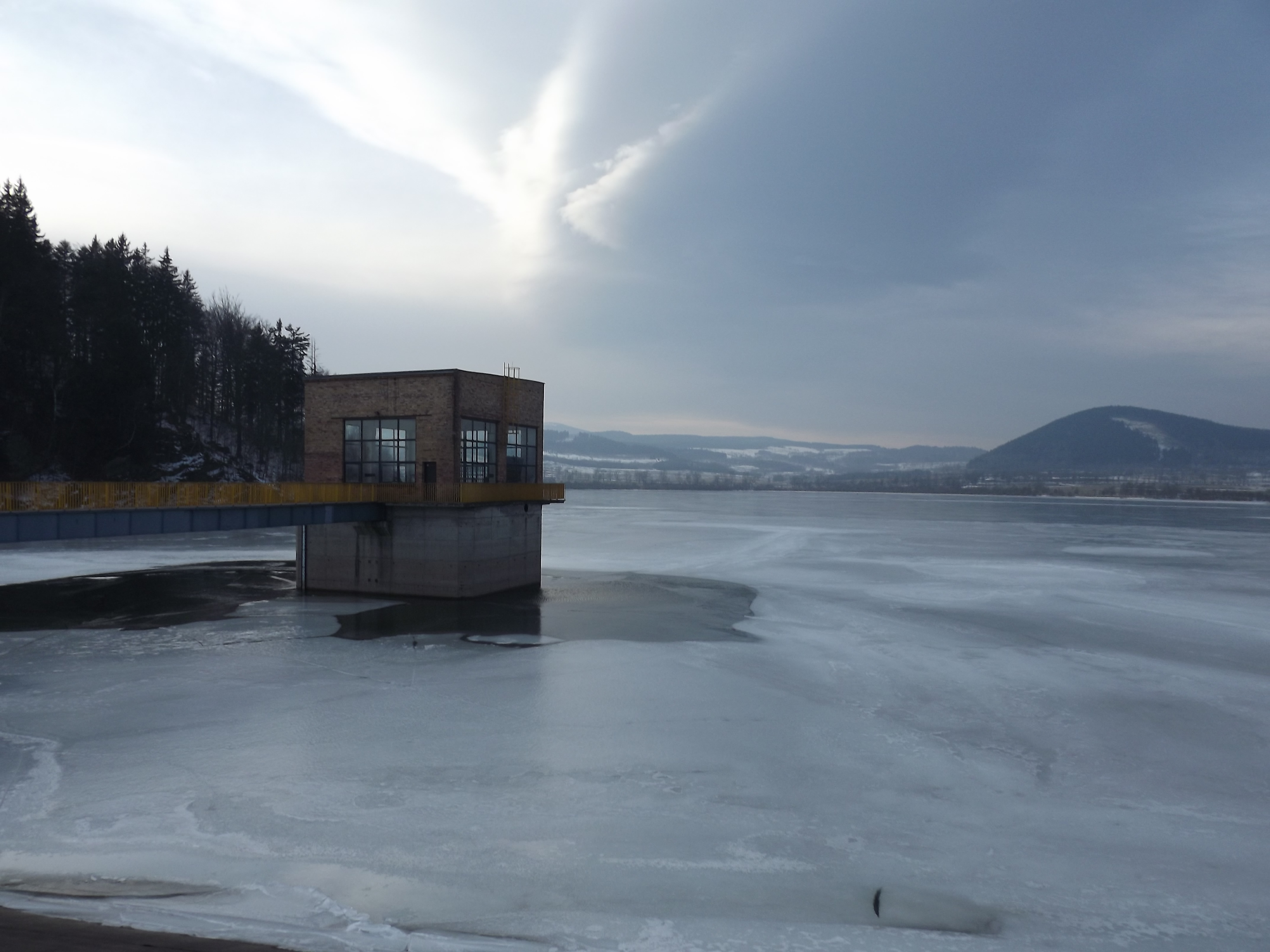
- Bukówka Lake

- Location within Poland
- Coordinates: 50°42′47″N 15°56′46″E
- Type: lake
- Basin countries: Poland
- Surface area: 1.99 km^{2} (0.77 sq mi)
- Max. depth: 20 m (66 ft)
- Water volume: 16.9×10^{6} m^{3} (13,700 acre⋅ft)

Bukówka Lake is a retention reservoir located in the drainage basin of the River Bóbr, in the Gmina Lubawka, Kamienna Góra County, Lower Silesian Voivodeship; in Poland.
