= Konin Lakes =

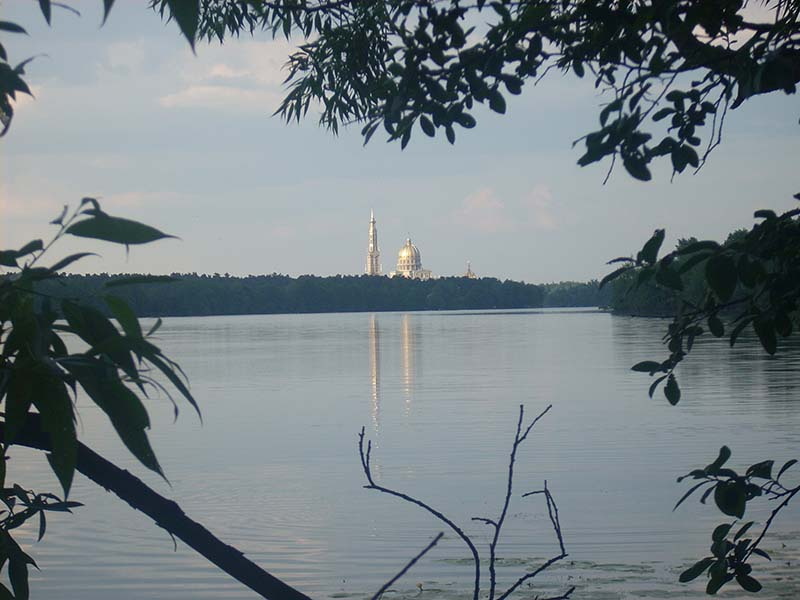
- Licheńskie is the shallowest of the Konin Lakes

- Location within Poland Location within Europe
- Location: Poland
- Coordinates: 52°19′48″N 18°18′36″E
- Type: Group of lakes
- Max. length: 32 kilometres (20 mi)
- Surface area: 148 hectares (370 acres)
- Max. depth: 38 metres (125 ft)
- Max. temperature: 31 °C (88 °F)

The Konin Lakes are a group of lakes forming a 32-kilometre (20 mi) long navigable channel in central Poland. The lakes include Pątnowskie Lake, Mikorzyńskie Lake, Gosławskie Lake, Licheńskie Lake and Ślesińskie Lake, connecting the River Warta and Lake Gopło and linked to the Warta-Goplo Canal.

The lakes are of particular interest because they receive the water outlets from two power stations and the temperature of the water is significantly raised, supporting a different flora and fauna to other lakes in the region. Water for the two power stations is drawn primarily from Lake Pątnowskie, and discharged via canals to Lake Licheńskie, with other outlets flowing into the other lakes. The cooling scheme varies with the time of year, with Licheńskie, Ślesińskie and Mikorzyńskie being included in June but excluded in October.

The total area of the lakes is between 148 and 379 hectares (370 and 940 acres), and the greatest depth is 38 m (125 ft). Lake Licheńskie is shallow and shows the greatest temperature variation, reaching a maximum of 31 °C (88 °F) in mid summer while the deeper Lake Ślesińskie reached 27.7 °C (82 °F).

== Flora and fauna ==
In the mid 1990s, eel grass (Vallisneria spiralis), a non-native species, made its appearance in three of the lakes and a decade later was present in the littoral regions of four lakes, growing so vigorously as to exclude other vegetation in many shallow parts. The changes in temperature and in vegetation altered the balance of micro-organisms present, new rotifer species appeared and competed with existing species, native populations often having little defence and being crowded out. Larger organisms also appeared; non-native species now living and breeding in the lakes include three species of bryozoan, three crustaceans, seven molluscs and at least six species of fish.

The hotter water encourages eutrophication and alters the proportions of fish species present; common bream and white bream are able to thrive while populations of predatory fish diminish. When the discharges from the power station into Lakes Licheńskie, Ślesińskie and Mikorzyńskie cease in the autumn, common roach numbers diminish from 28–56% of the total fish stock in June to 1–2% in October. It is probable that the roaches migrate to the warmer lakes nearer the power stations in autumn. A number of animals more familiar from marine or brackish environments are also present in the Konin Lakes; these include the flatworms Bresslauilla relicta, Otomesostoma auditivum and Macrostomum rostratum.
