= Ribbon lake =

Long and narrow, finger-shaped lake, usually found in a glacial trough

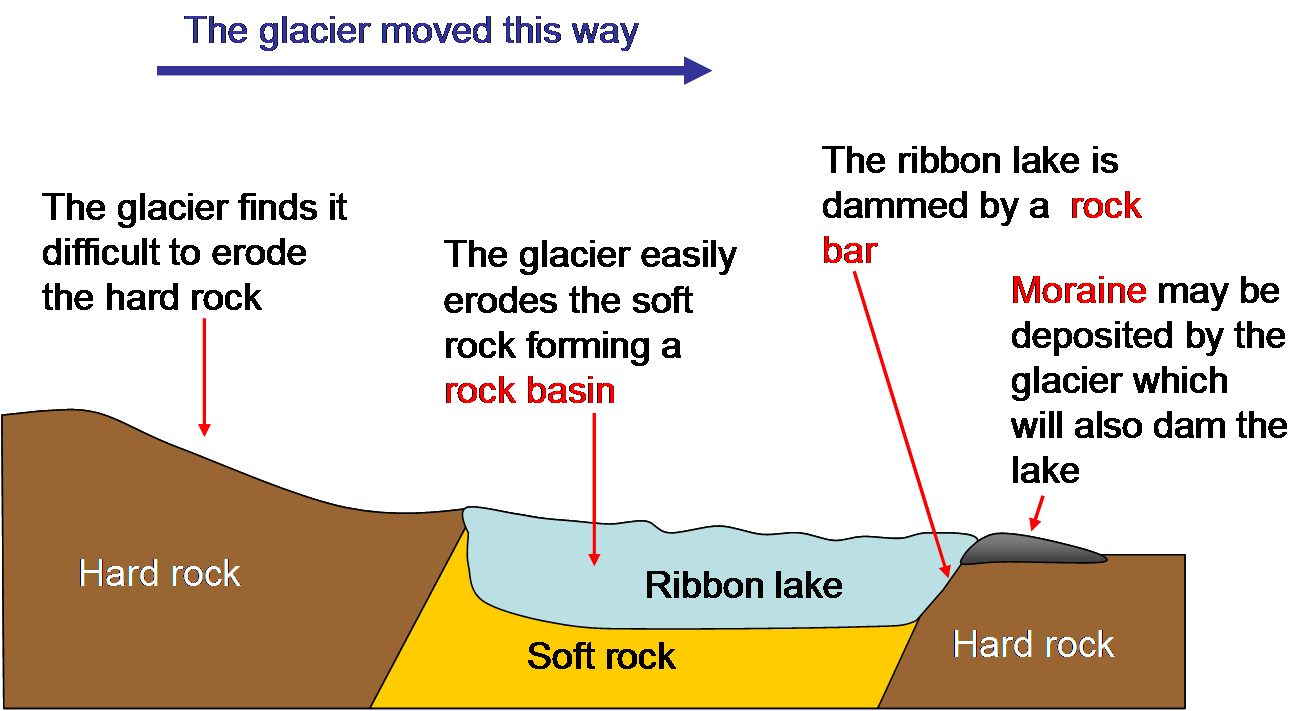
Formation of a ribbon lake

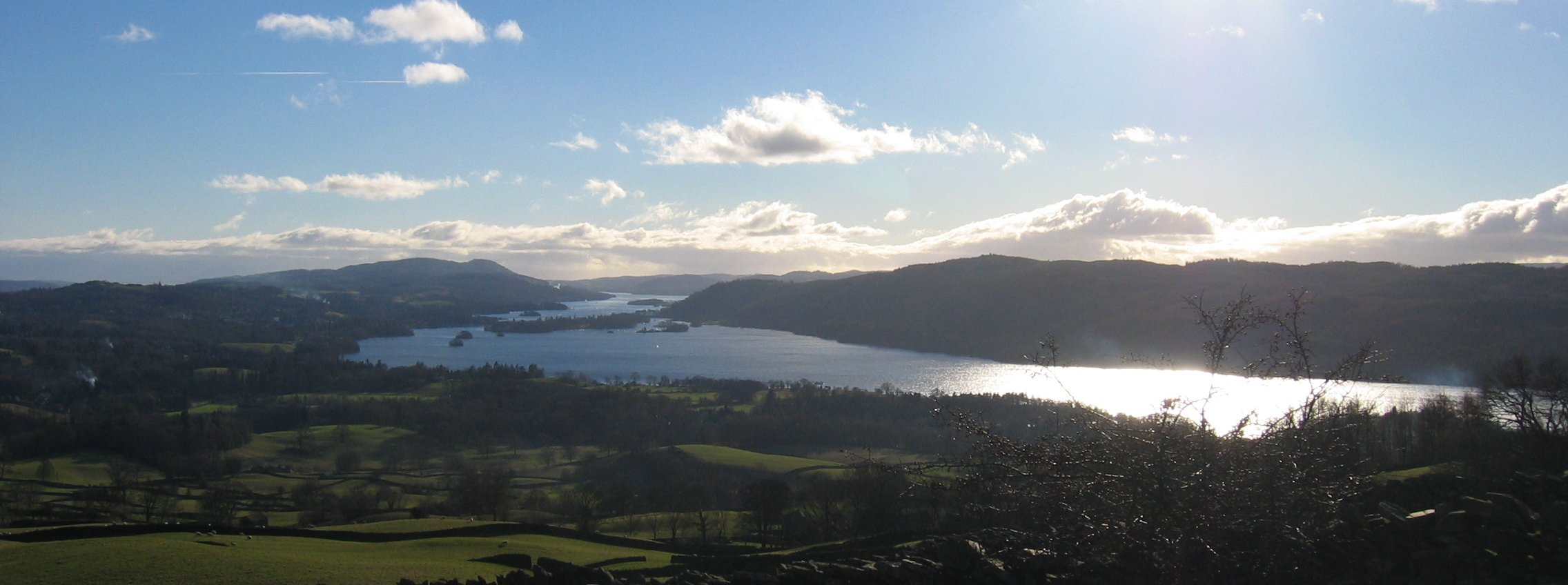
Windermere in the Lake District

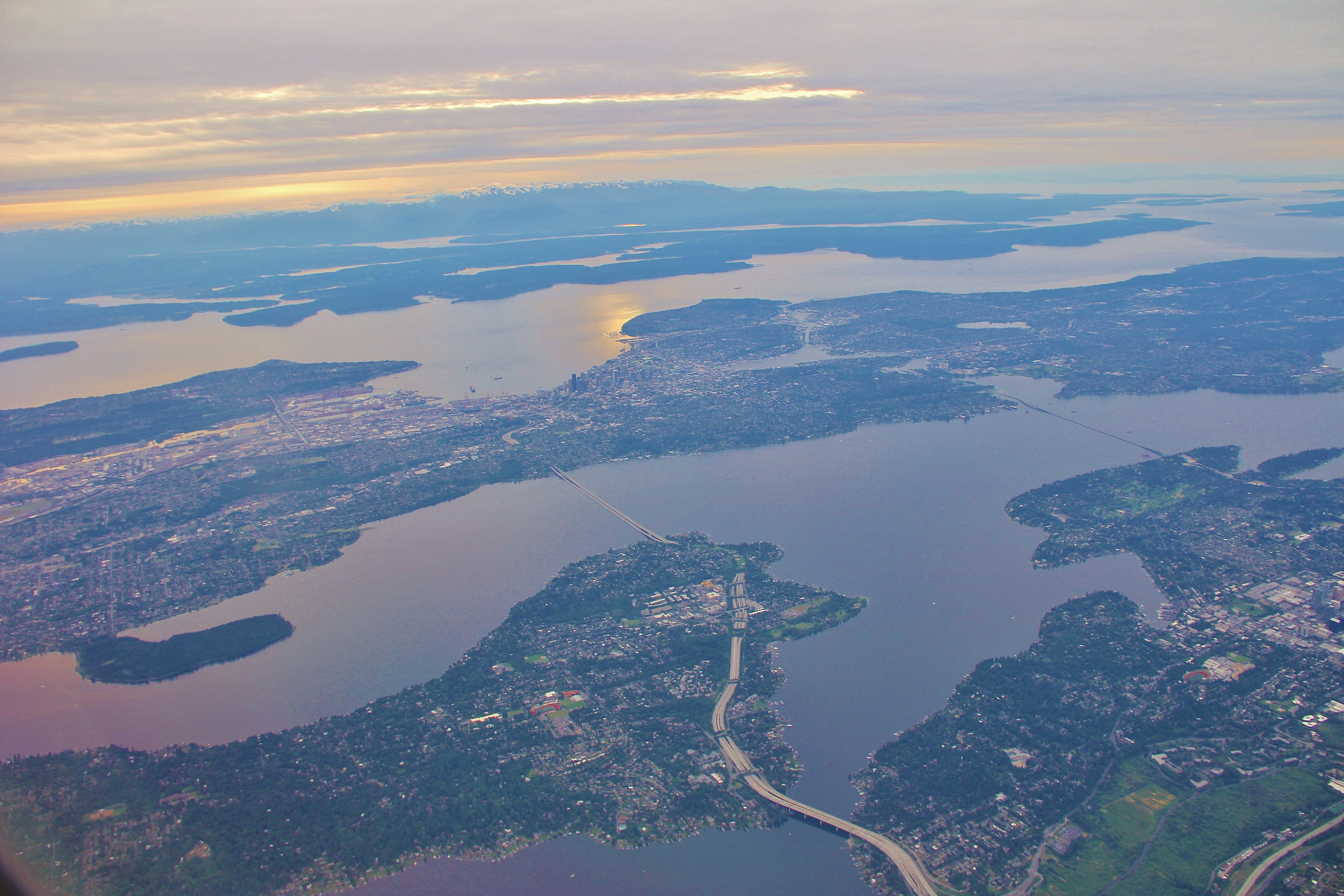
A part of Lake Washington.

A ribbon lake is a long and very deep, finger-shaped lake, usually found in a glacial trough. As such, a ribbon lake is one of a number of glacial landscapes, including arêtes, corries, rock lips, rock basins and terminal moraines.

Such a lake's formation begins when a glacier moves over an area containing alternate bands of hard and soft bedrock. The sharp-edged boulders that are picked up by the glacier and carried at the bottom of the glacier erode the softer rock more quickly by abrasion, thus creating a hollow called a rock basin. On either side of the rock basin, the more resistant rock is eroded less and these outcrops of harder rock are known as rock bars, which act as dams between which rainwater may accumulate after the retreat of the ice age, filling up the rock basin and creating a ribbon lake. A ribbon lake may also form behind a terminal or recessional moraine, both of which also act as dams, enabling water to accumulate behind them.

A ribbon lake may also occur if a tributary glacier joins a main glacier. The increase in power can create a trough, which is filled with water from a river/meltwater to create a ribbon lake.

Examples of ribbon lakes include Windermere, the largest natural lake in England; Panguipulli Lake, in southern Chile; Lake Washington, in the state of Washington; Lake Ruda Woda in northern Poland and Llyn Ogwen, in northwestern Wales.
