= Lake Drwęca =

Lake in Poland

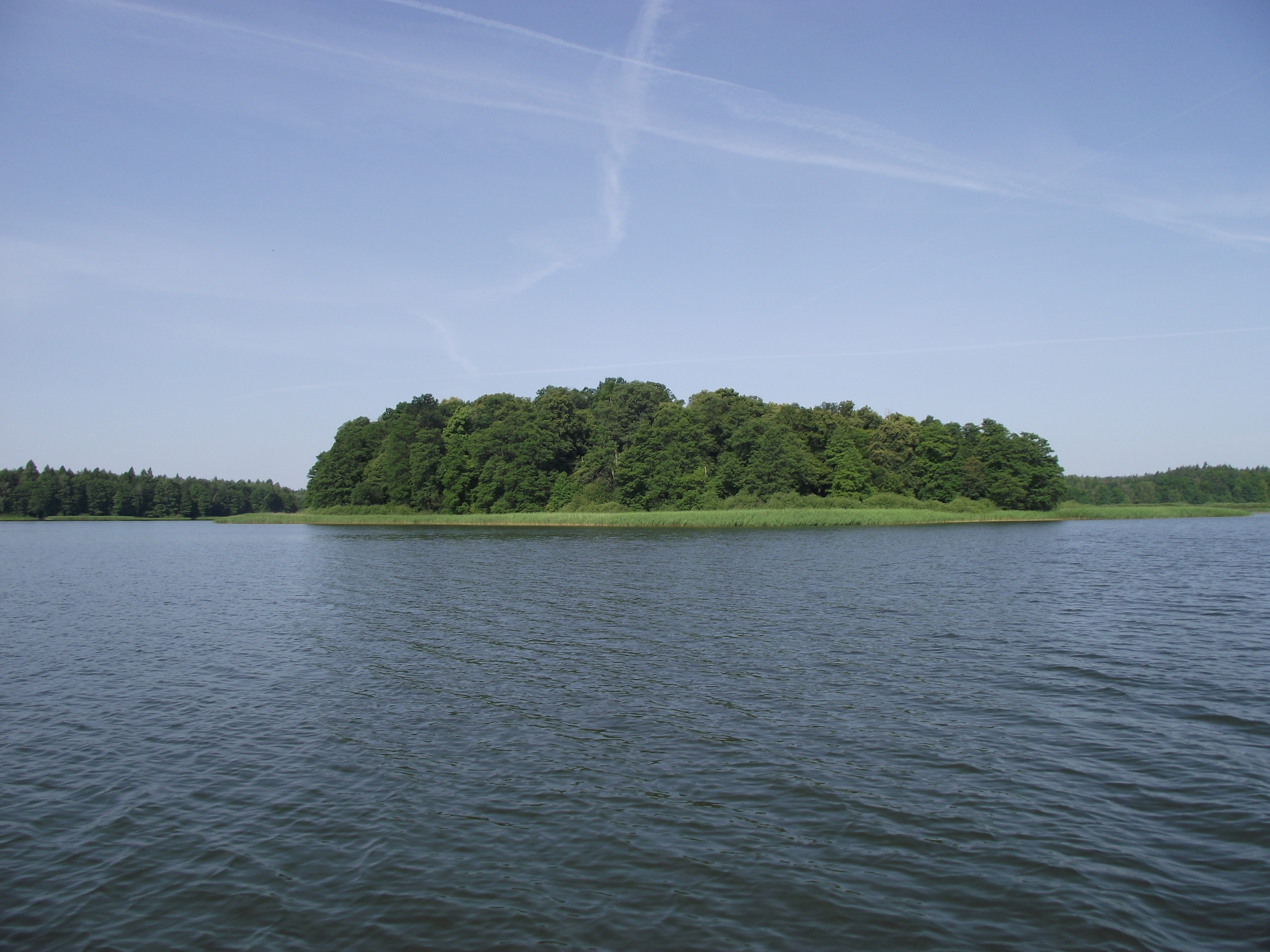
- View of Nut Island (Wyspa Orzechowa)

- Location within Warmian-Masurian Voivodeship
- Location: Drwęca River Valley
- Coordinates: 53°41′33″N 19°51′30″E
- Primary inflows: Drwęca
- Primary outflows: Drwęca
- Basin countries: Poland
- Surface area: 880.8 ha (2,177 acres)
- Islands: 1
- Settlements: Ostróda

Lake Drwęca (Polish: Jezioro Drwęckie, German: Drewenzer See, Lithuanian: Druvinčia) is a ribbon lake in Poland, located in the Warmian-Masurian Voivodeship, in Ostróda County, in administrative boundaries of Ostróda, Gmina Ostróda and Gmina Miłomłyn, in the Drwęca River Valley mesoregion The Drwęca river flows through it.
