= Boyen Fortress =

Coordinates: 54°1′55″N 21°44′52″E

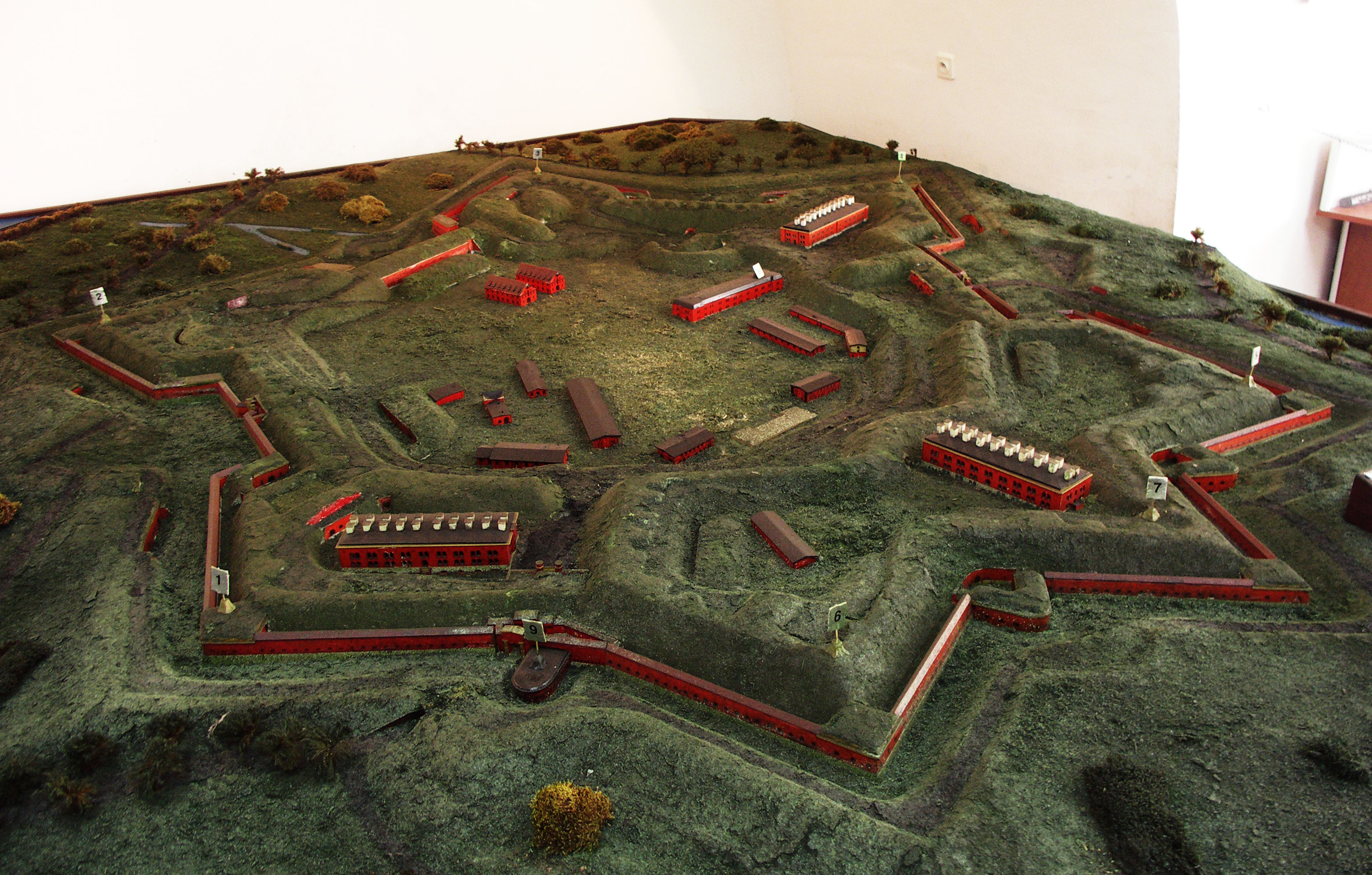
Model of the fortress

Boyen Fortress (German: Feste Boyen, Polish: Twierdza Boyen) is a former Prussian fortress located in the western part of Giżycko, in Warmian-Masurian Voivodeship, northeastern Poland. It is situated on a narrow isthmus between two large lakes of the Masurian Lake District, Kisajno and Niegocin.

== History ==
The Boyen Fortress, named after Prussian Minister of War Hermann von Boyen, was built between 1844 and 1856 (or 1843 and 1855 according to some sources) by order of King Frederick William IV, with a workforce of about 3,000 soldiers.

During First World War, the fortress supported the German troops during the nearby Battle of Tannenberg in the summer of 1914 with its long range artillery, and with its garrison engaged in feint operations. During Second World War, the fortress was not involved in military operations. It was a site for a field hospital and headquarters of the German military intelligence service (Fremde Heere Ost) under Reinhard Gehlen in 1942–1945. It was abandoned by Germans without fight in 1944.

After the war the fortress became administered by the Polish Army. In 1975, it was declared a monument and opened as a tourist attraction with a small museum on its grounds.

== Bibliography ==
- Jurgen Thorwald: Illusion - Soviet soldiers in Hitler's army, OWN Warsaw - Kraków in 1994 (orig. Ger. 1974), ISBN 978-83-01-11579-1
- Bogdan Vasilenko: Mamry and the surrounding area. Guide, Kętrzyn in 1996, ISBN 83-905491-0-7
