= Giżycko =

Town in Warmian-Masurian Voivodeship, Poland

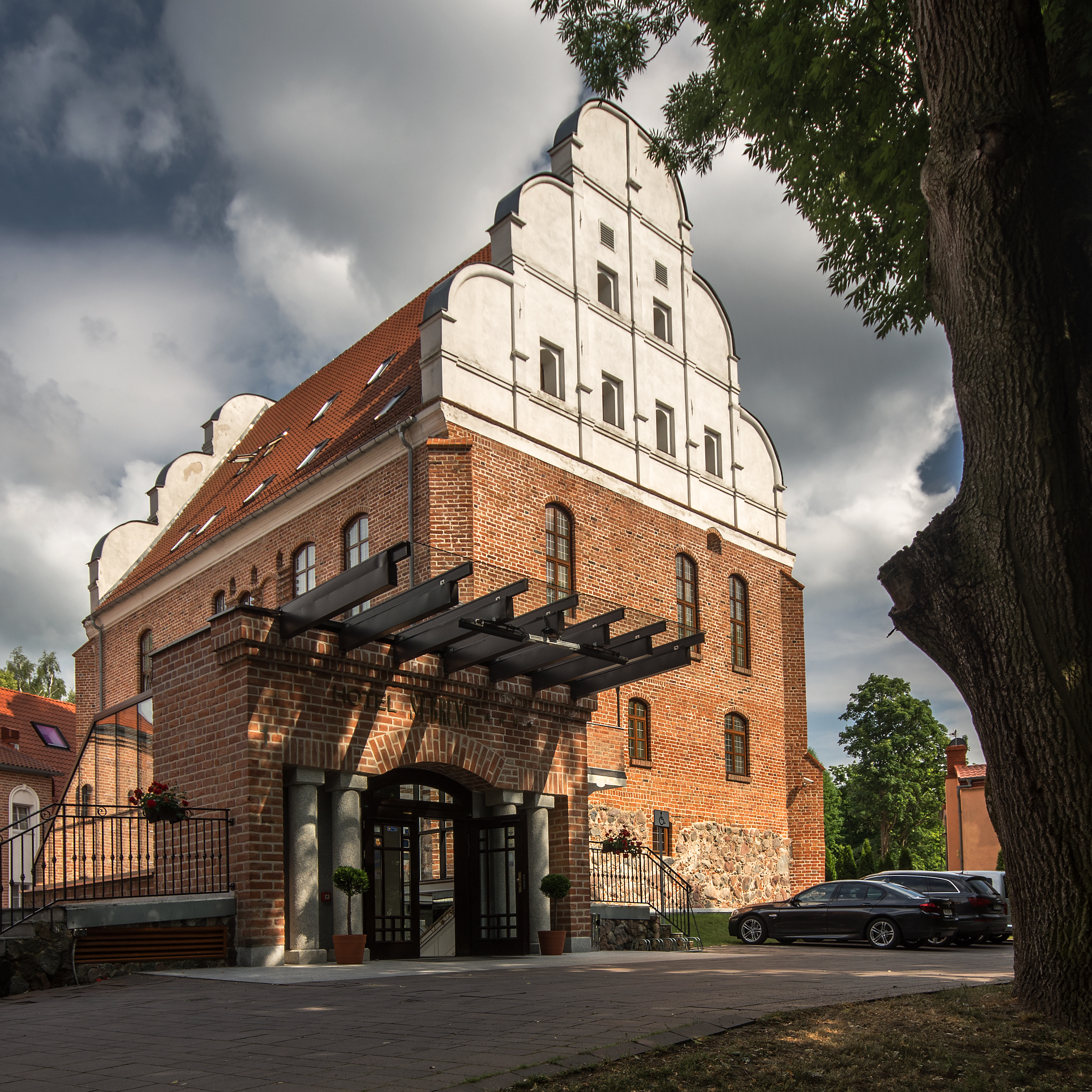
- Giżycko Castle, 14th century

- Flag Coat of arms

- Location within Poland Location within Warmian-Masurian Voivodeship
- Coordinates: 54°2′24″N 21°45′32″E
- Country: Poland
- Voivodeship: Warmian-Masurian
- County: Giżycko County
- Gmina: Giżycko (urban gmina)
- Established: 1335
- Town rights: 1612

Government
  - Mayor: Ewa Ostrowska

Area
  - Total: 13.87 km^{2} (5.36 sq mi)
- Highest elevation: 142 m (466 ft)
- Lowest elevation: 116 m (381 ft)

Population (1 January 2025)
  - Total: 27,107
  - Density: 1,954/km^{2} (5,062/sq mi)
- Time zone: UTC+1 (CET)
  - Summer (DST): UTC+2 (CEST)
- Postal code: 11-500
- Area code: +48 87
- Car plates: NGI
- Website: http://www.gizycko.pl

Giżycko (Polish pronunciation: [ɡʲiˈʐɨt͡skɔ]; former Polish: Lec or Łuczany; German: Lötzen, pronounced [ˈlœtsn̩]) is a town in northeastern Poland with 27,107 inhabitants as of January 2025. It is situated between Lake Kisajno and Lake Niegocin in the region of Masuria, within the Warmian-Masurian Voivodeship. It is the seat of Giżycko County.

Giżycko is a popular summer tourist destination due to its location within the Masurian Lake District and possesses numerous historical monuments, including a 14th-century Teutonic castle.

== History ==
=== Antiquity and Middle Ages ===
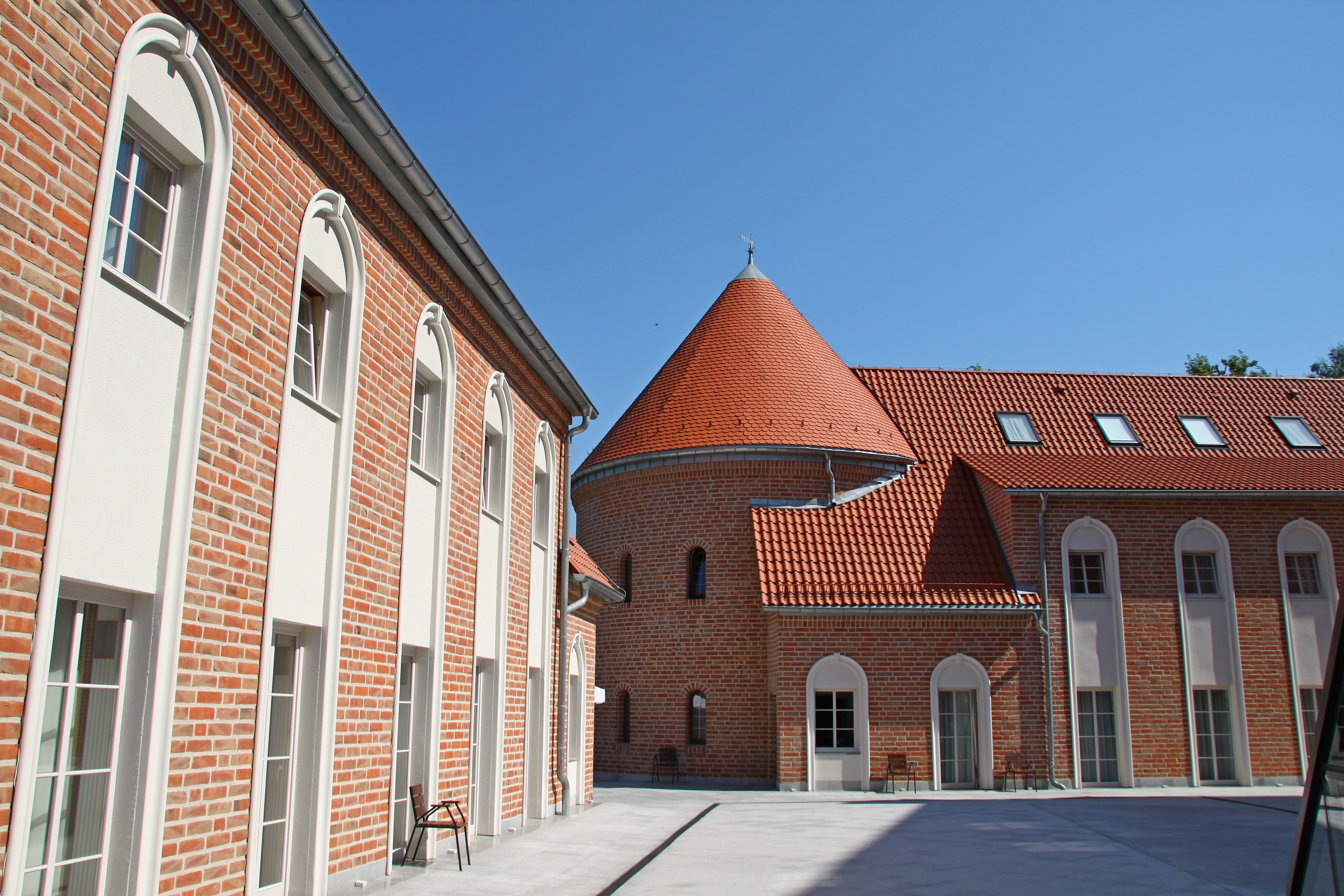
The renovated castle

The first known settlements in the area of today's Giżycko were recorded in Roman times by Tacitus in his Germania and are connected to Amber Road in vicinity of which Giżycko was located. A defensive settlement of the Baltic Prussians was known to exist in the area, and in IX was recorded as being ruled by king known as Izegup or Jesegup.

After his failed attempt in 997 AD Bolesław I the Brave sent another expedition in 1008 to conquer/Christianize the Old Prussians. Just like St. Adalbert the missionary Bruno of Querfurt was killed by Sudovians near Lake Niegocin in 1009, and a memorial the Bruno – cross was erected near in 1910.

The Teutonic Knights built a castle named Lötzen (Łuczany in Polish, later also Lec) in 1340, located at the isthmus between two lakes in today's Masuria. Lötzen was administered within the commandery of Balga. Since the Late Middle Ages, it was mainly populated by Poles from nearby Mazovia, known as Masurians.

In 1454, Polish King Casimir IV Jagiellon incorporated the region to the Kingdom of Poland upon the request of the Prussian Confederation, and after the subsequent outbreak of the Thirteen Years’ War in 1454, Łuczany sided with Poland. The settlement was captured by the Teutonic Knights in 1455, but the Poles recaptured it the next year. After the peace treaty signed in Toruń in 1466 it became part of Poland as a fief held by the Teutonic Order, until the dissolution of the Teutonic state in 1525.

=== Modern era ===
Map of Lötzen and surroundings (c. 1818)

The settlement near the castle received town privileges, with a coat of arms and seal, in 1612, while part of the Duchy of Prussia (under Polish suzerainty until 1701). The first mayor was Paweł Rudzki. The Polish name of the town, used by its overwhelmingly Polish population, at the time was Łuczany.

Lötzen became part of the Kingdom of Prussia in 1701 and was made part of the newly established province of East Prussia in 1773. In 1709/10 the plague claimed 800 victims, only 119 inhabitants survived. In the 19th century, a new Lutheran church based on design by Karl Friedrich Schinkel was erected in the centre of the town. Lötzen became part of the German Empire in 1871 during the Prussian-led unification of Germany.

In June 1807, the Polish corps of generals Józef Zajączek and Jan Henryk Dąbrowski were stationed in the town. After the Napoleonic Wars, the town was hit by fire and famine. King Frederick William IV of Prussia, during his visit in 1845, was received in the town by 10,000 impoverished people chanting Chleba! (Bread! in Polish). The King replied to the crowd in Polish as the last Prussian ruler to speak Polish. From 1875 to 1892 the Polish-language weekly newspaper Gazeta Lecka was published.

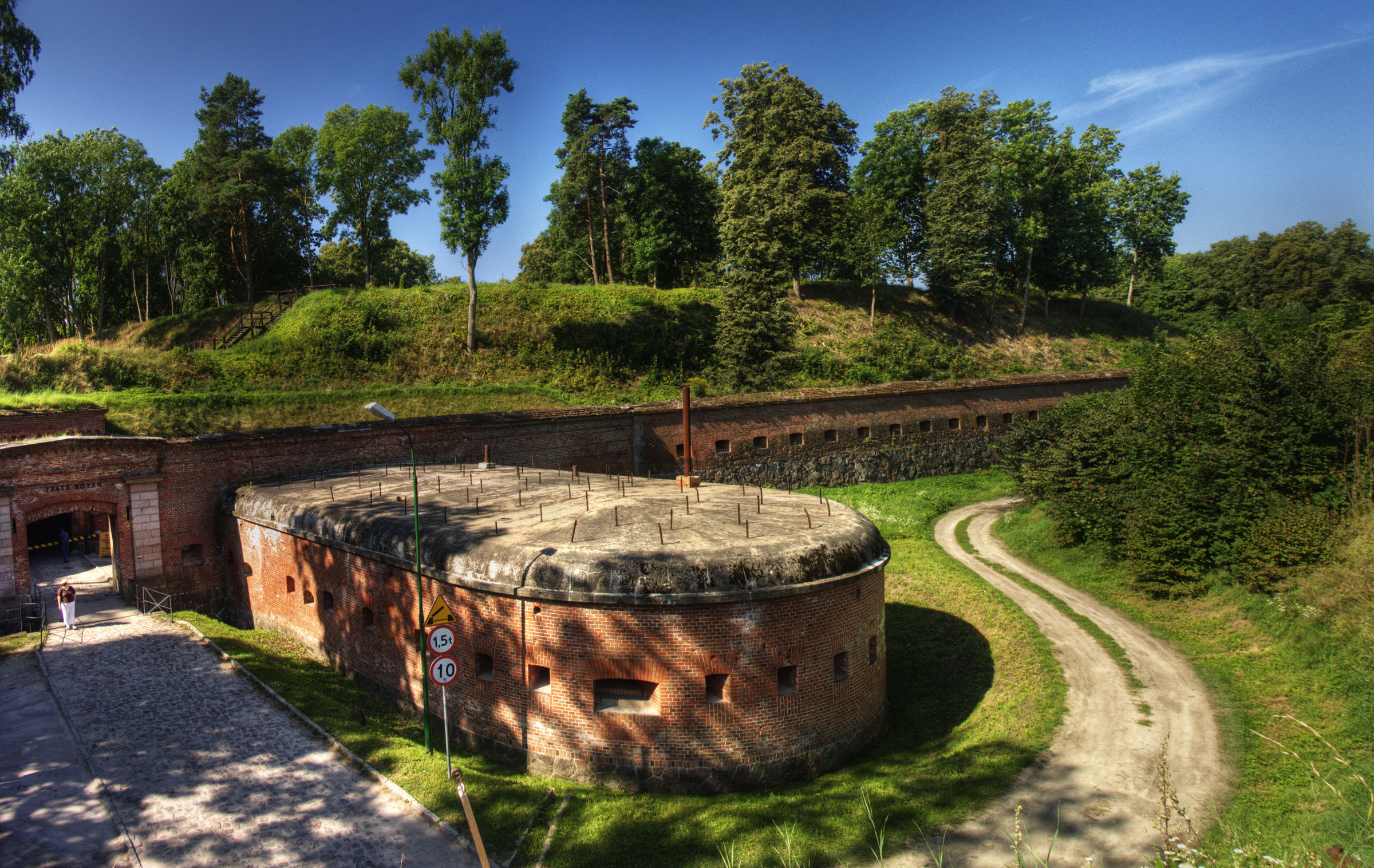
Boyen Fortress

In 1844–1848 the Boyen Fortress, a fortress named after the Prussian war-minister Hermann von Boyen, was built on a small landtongue between lake Mamry (Mauersee) and lake Niegocin (Löwentinsee). This fortress is one of the largest and best conditioned fortresses of the 19th century. In 1942–1945 it was the headquarters of the German military intelligence service (Fremde Heere Ost) under Reinhard Gehlen.

As a result of the treaty of Versailles, the 1920 East Prussian plebiscite was organized under the control of the League of Nations. During the preparations for the plebiscite, a German militia attacked a pro-Polish rally with around 1,000 people. Speakers and people attending the rally were severely beaten; the main pro-Polish leader of the rally Fryderyk Leyk was beaten so badly that he just barely survived. Afterwards the attitude of Polish population in the town was resigned and part of the population boycotted the vote while others openly voted for Germany fearing revenge; 4,900 votes were cast to remain in East Prussia, and therefore Germany, and none for Poland. Afterwards aggressive Germanisation was intensified, and during Nazi rule in Germany, there was practical ban on speaking Polish in public places in the town.

In the 1930s Lötzen was the garrison of several military units of the Wehrmacht as a Sub-area Headquarter of Wehrkreis I, which was headquartered at Königsberg. Staff-, maintenance- and guardtroops of Hitler's headquarter Wolfsschanze and the Oberkommando des Heeres (OKH, army high command) were also based in or nearby Lötzen. The OKH was based at the Mauerwald area, ca. 10 km north of Giżycko, an undestroyed bunker system.

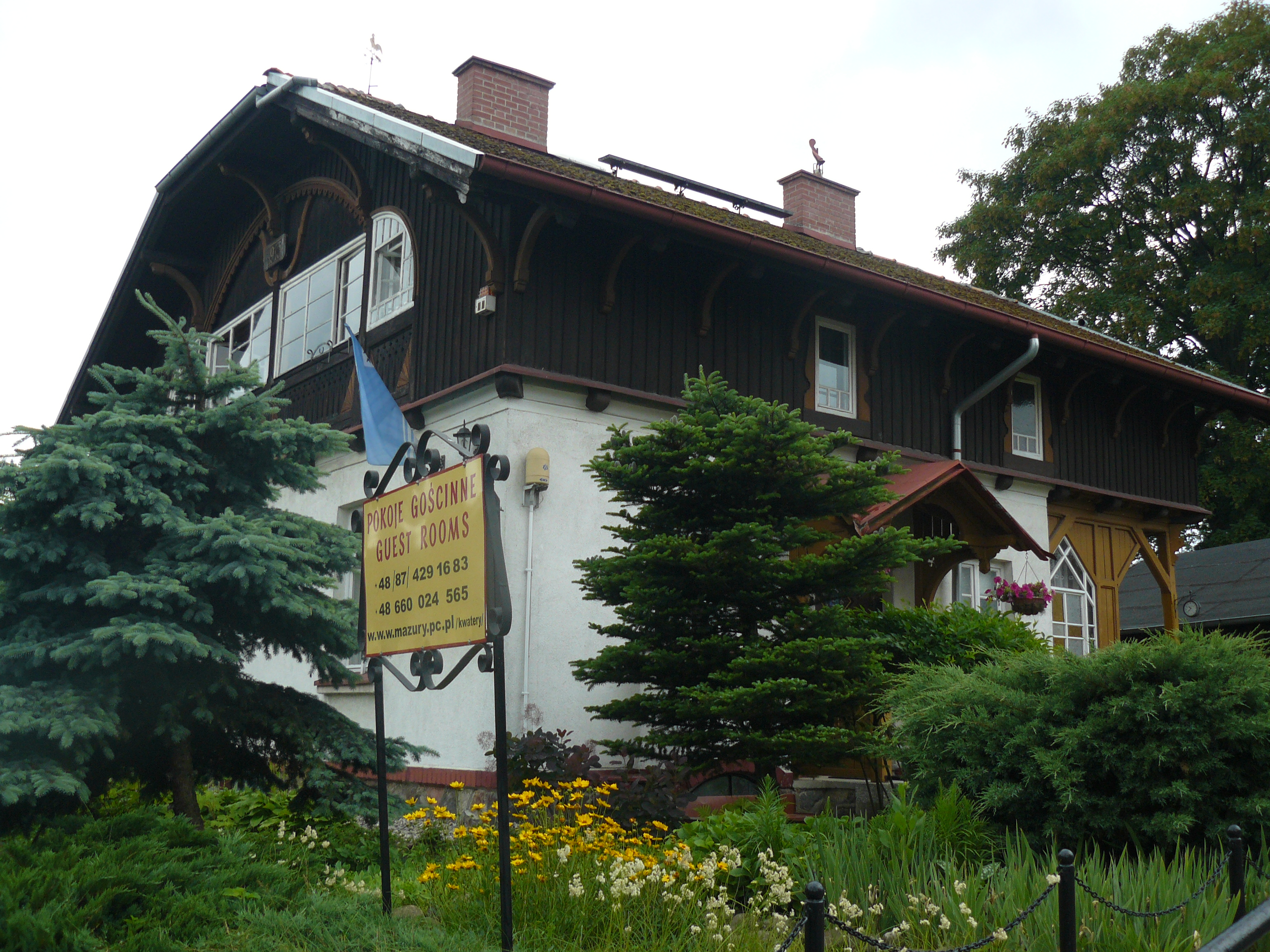
Home of Jan Mieczaniec, the first post-World War II mayor of Giżycko

The town was occupied by the Soviet Union's Red Army in 1945 during World War II and placed under Polish administration after the war ended. As part of territorial changes demanded by the Soviet Union, Polish rule was accepted at the Potsdam Conference, however, on preliminary terms. The transfer was confirmed by the German–Polish Border Treaty.

The German-speaking populace who had not been evacuated during the war were subsequently expelled westward in accordance with the Potsdam Agreement. The remaining Polish populace was joined by Poles displaced from former eastern Poland annexed by the Soviet Union, particularly from the Vilnius Region. The town was renamed Giżycko in 1946 in honor of the Masurian folklorist Gustaw Gizewiusz, a 19th-century Evangelical-Lutheran pastor in southern Masuria, who had greatly supported Polish language and Polish culture and stood against Germanisation of Masuria.

== Demographics ==
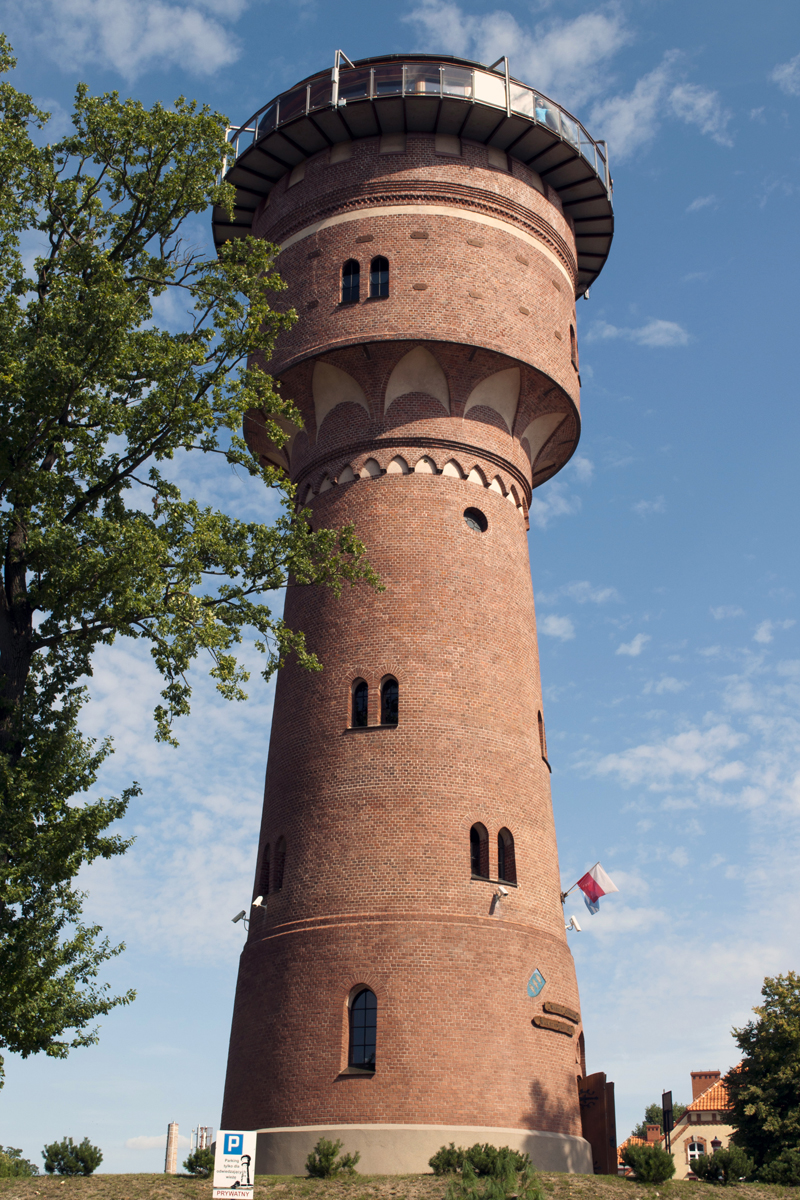
Water tower, available for visitors

Up to the 19th century, the Polish population formed a majority in the city, with a small presence of Germans. By the middle of 19th century German minority became much more numerous and Germanization made rapid progress in the city.

Historical population

Year	Pop.	±%
1875	4,034	—
1880	4,514	+11.9%
1890	5,486	+21.5%
1900	5,826	+6.2%
1910	7,014	+20.4%
1925	10,552	+50.4%

Year	Pop.	±%
1933	11,847	+12.3%
1939	14,000	+18.2%
1950	10,015	−28.5%
1960	14,817	+47.9%
2006	29,667	+100.2%
2021	28,597	−3.6%

== Sports ==
When Poland made the so far only international appearance in bandy, the city was represented. The local football team is Mamry Giżycko. It competes in the lower leagues.

== Education ==
=== Primary school ===
- Szkoła Podstawowa nr 4 im. I Dywizji Piechoty
- Szkoła podstawowa nr 5
- Szkoła Podstawowa nr 6
- Szkoła Podstawowa nr 7 im. Janusza Korczaka

=== Middle school ===
- Gimnazjum nr 1 w Giżycku im. Jana Pawła II
- Gimnazjum nr 2 w Giżycku im. Chwały Oręża Polskiego
- Katolickie Gimnazjum im. św. Brunona z Kwerfurtu
- Zespół Szkół nr 1 im. Mikołaja Kopernika

=== High school ===
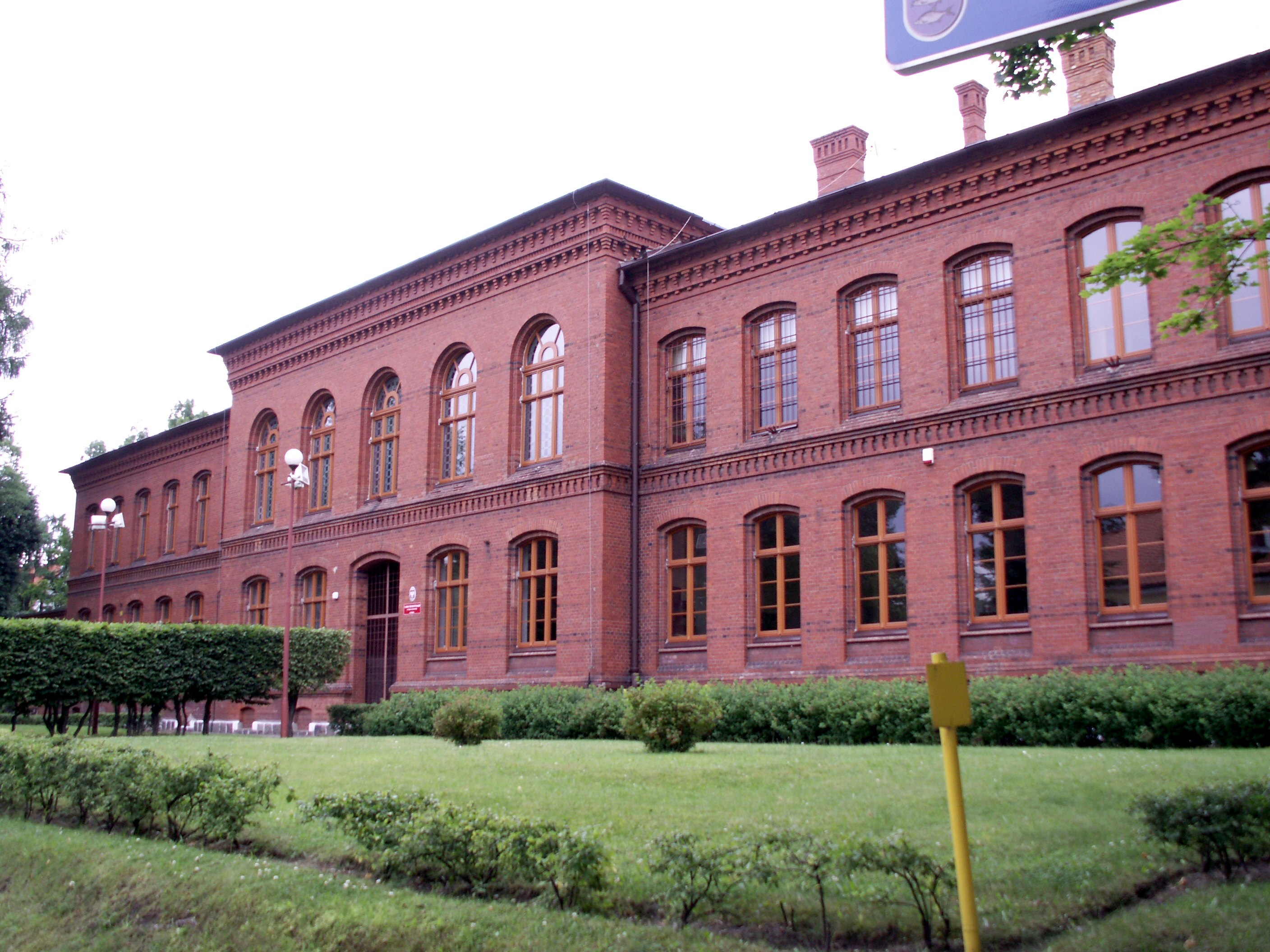
I Liceum Ogólnokształcące (high school)

- I Liceum Ogólnokształcące im. Wojciecha Kętrzyńskiego
- II Liceum Ogólnokształcące im. Gustawa Gizewiusza
- Zespół Szkół Elektronicznych i Informatycznych im. Komisji Edukacji Narodowej
- Zespół Szkół Kształtowania Środowiska i Agrobiznesu
- Zespół Szkół Zawodowych
- Katolickie Liceum im. św. Brunona z Kwerfurtu

=== College ===
- Medyczne Studium Zawodowe im. Hanny Chrzanowskiej
- Prywatna Wyższa Szkoła Zawodowa

== Notable residents ==
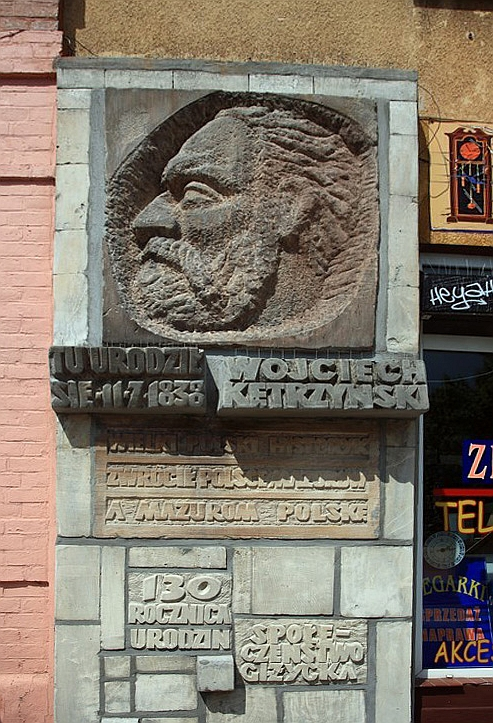
Memorial plaque at the birthplace of Wojciech Kętrzyński

- Marcin Giersz (1808–1895), Masurian activist, publicist of Polish literature
- Gustaw Gizewiusz (1810–1848), Polish pastor, folklorist, and translator
- Wojciech Kętrzyński (1838–1918), Polish historian and activist
- Paul Davidson (1867–1927), German film producer
- Jan Bułhak (1876–1950), Polish pioneer of photography in Poland
- Franz Pfemfert (1879–1954), German publisher
- Lothar Gall (1936–2024), German historian
- Łukasz Broź (born 1985), Polish footballer
- Mateusz Broź (born 1988), Polish footballer
- Marcin Budziński (born 1990), Polish footballer
- Patryk Kun (born 1995), Polish footballer
- Jakub Kochanowski (born 1997), Polish volleyball player, 2018 World Champion

== International relations ==
=== Twin towns — Sister cities ===
Giżycko is twinned with:

Dubno, Ukraine; Querfurt, Germany; Neumünster, Germany	Silkeborg, Denmark; Trakai, Lithuania; Starachowice, Poland; Ghazni, Afghanistan

== Gallery ==
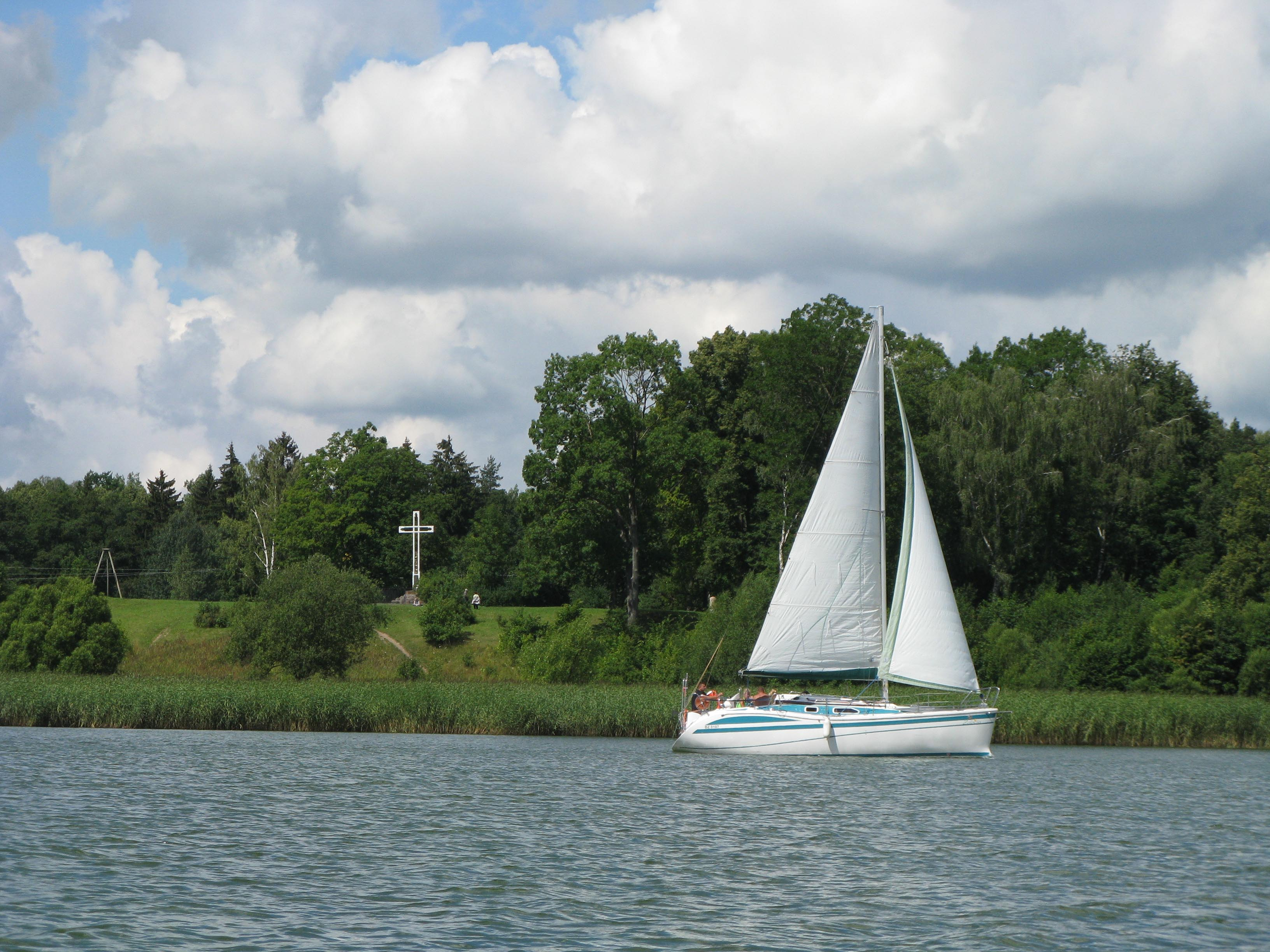
Bruno of Querfurt Hill and Cross in Giżycko. View from Lake Niegocin

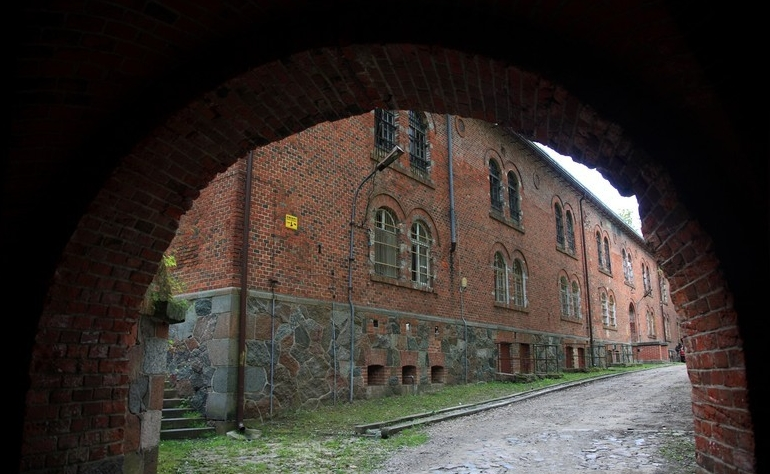
Boyen fortress

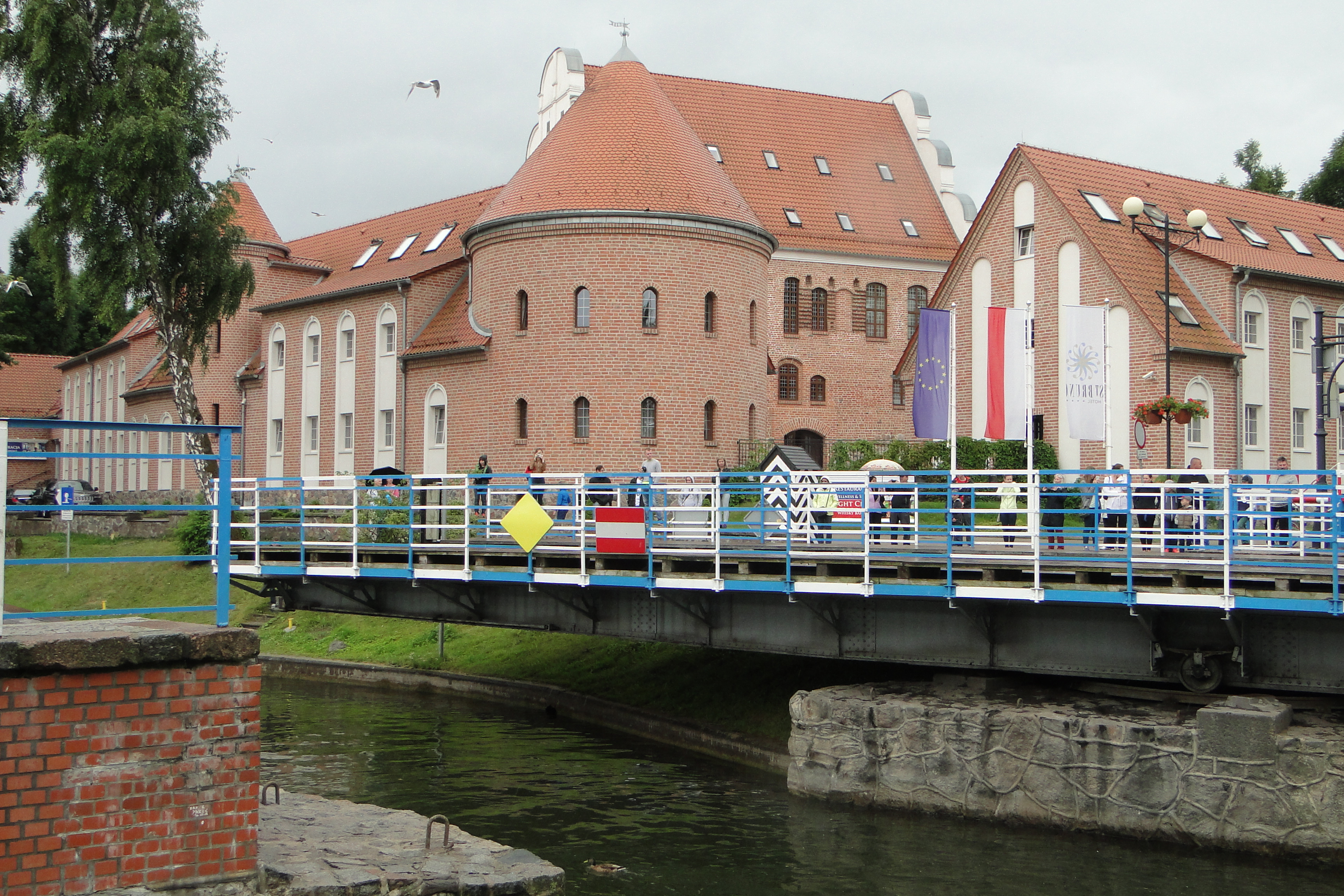
Swing bridge and the castle

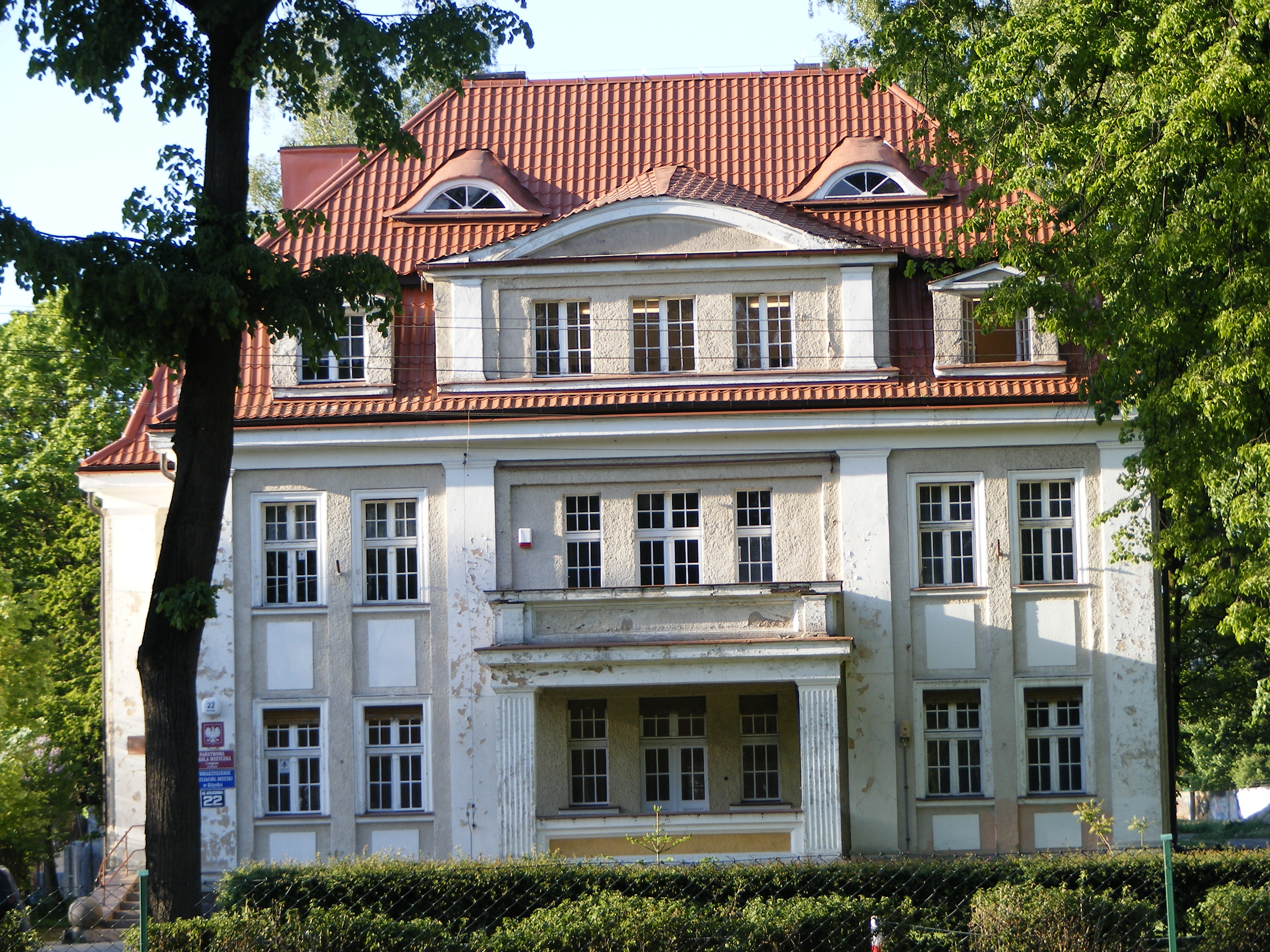
Music school

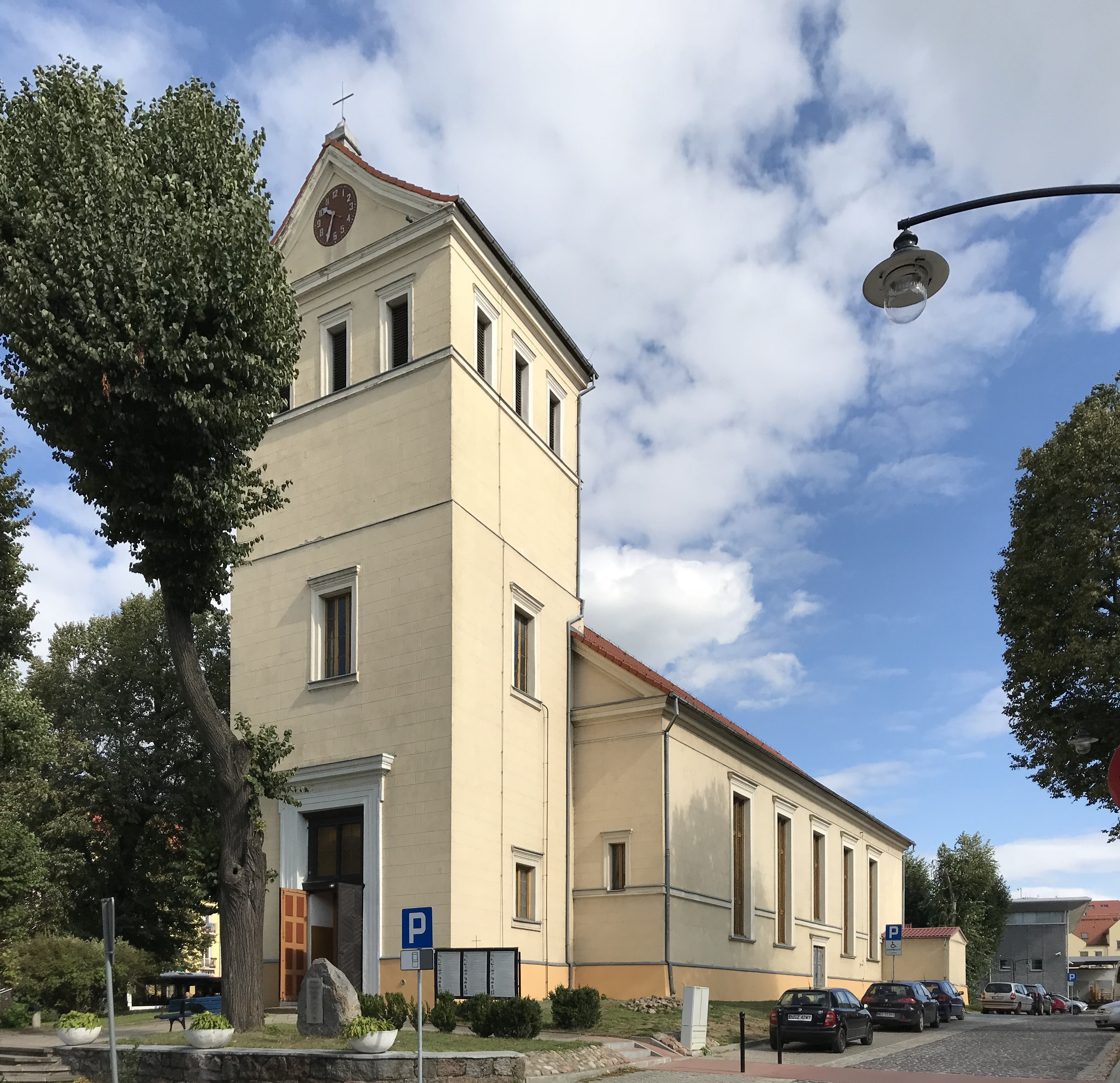
Evangelical church

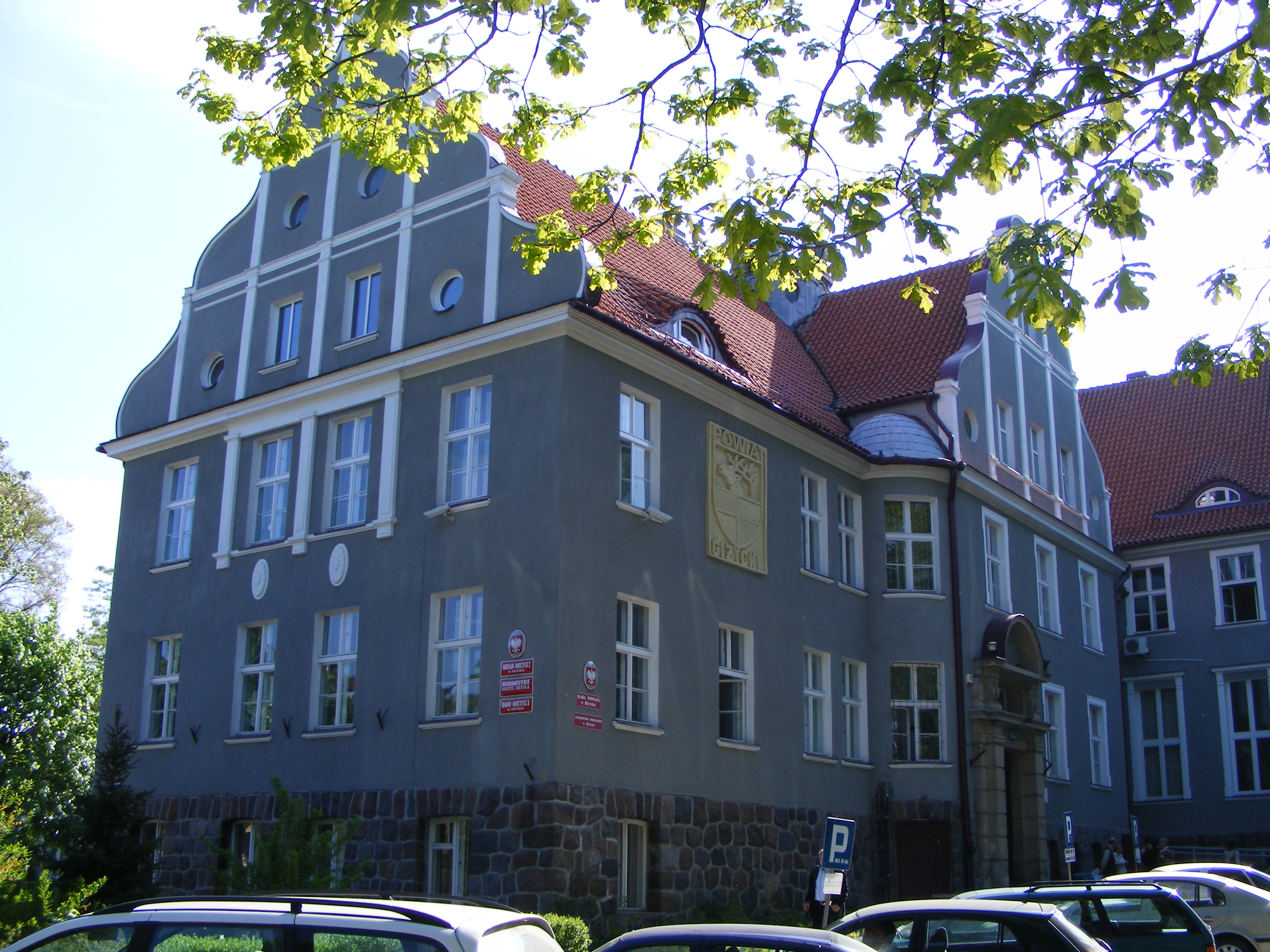
Town hall
