= Mateusz Broź =

Polish footballer (born 1988)

Personal information
- Full name: Mateusz Broź
- Date of birth: 12 July 1988 (age 38)
- Place of birth: Giżycko, Poland
- Height: 1.84 m (6 ft 0 in)
- Position: Attacking midfielder

Youth career
- ABC Bagbud Giżycko

Senior career*
Years	Team	Apps	(Gls)
2004	Mamry Giżycko		
2005–2006	Wisła Kraków II		
2007–2008	Widzew Łódź	10	(0)
2009–2010	Sandecja Nowy Sącz	22	(3)
2010	Kolejarz Stróże	10	(1)
2011–2012	Flota Świnoujście	16	(0)
2012–2013	Garbarnia Kraków	30	(18)
2013–2014	Motor Lublin	21	(2)
2014–2015	Widzew Łódź	10	(0)
2015–2016	Puszcza Niepołomice	32	(8)
2016–2017	Lechia Tomaszów Mazowiecki	16	(6)
2017	Warta Poznań	14	(2)
2017–2018	Siarka Tarnobrzeg	26	(7)
2018–2019	Sokół Ostróda	7	(2)
2019	Sokół Aleksandrów Łódzki	9	(0)
2019–2021	Pogoń Zduńska Wola	29	(25)
2021–2022	KS Kutno	6	(1)
2022	Andrespolia Wiśniowa Góra	7	(3)
2023	Olimpia Zduńska Wola	9	(14)
2023	Pogoń Zduńska Wola	6	(0)
2024	Jagiellonia Tuszyn	2	(0)
- * Club domestic league appearances and goals

Mateusz Broź (born 12 July 1988) is a Polish former professional footballer who played as an attacking midfielder. His brother Łukasz is also a professional player.

== Career ==
In summer 2010 he joined Kolejarz Stróże.

In July 2011, he signed a contract with Flota Świnoujście.

== Honours ==
Individual

- II liga East top scorer: 2012–13
