= Hans Manteuffel =

German architect

Hans Manteuffel (24 October 1879 – 17 January 1963) was a German architect.

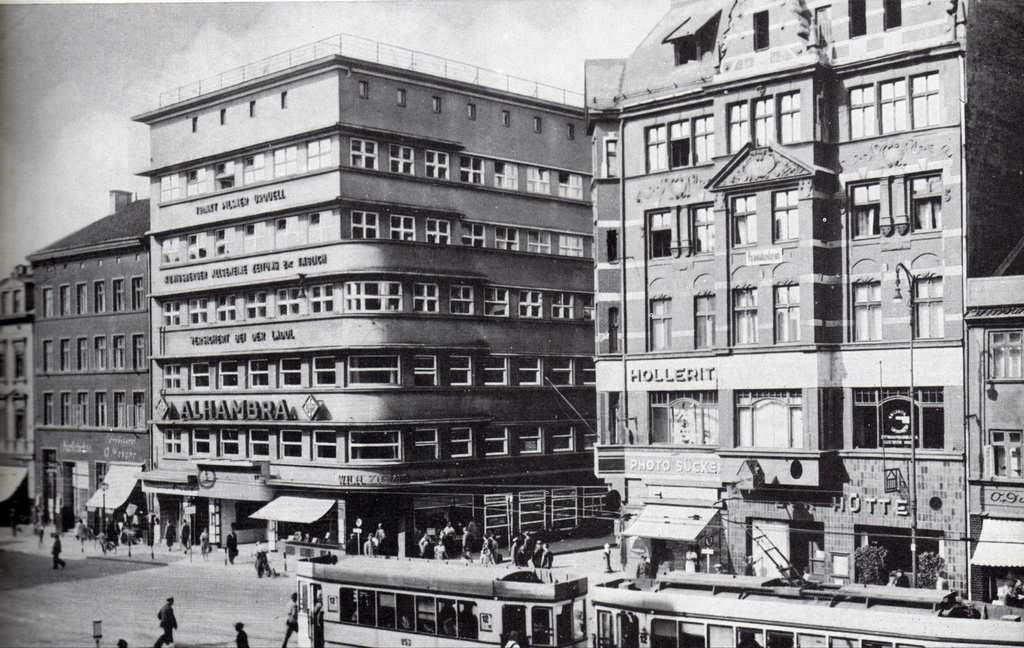
the Alhambra cinema in Königsberg

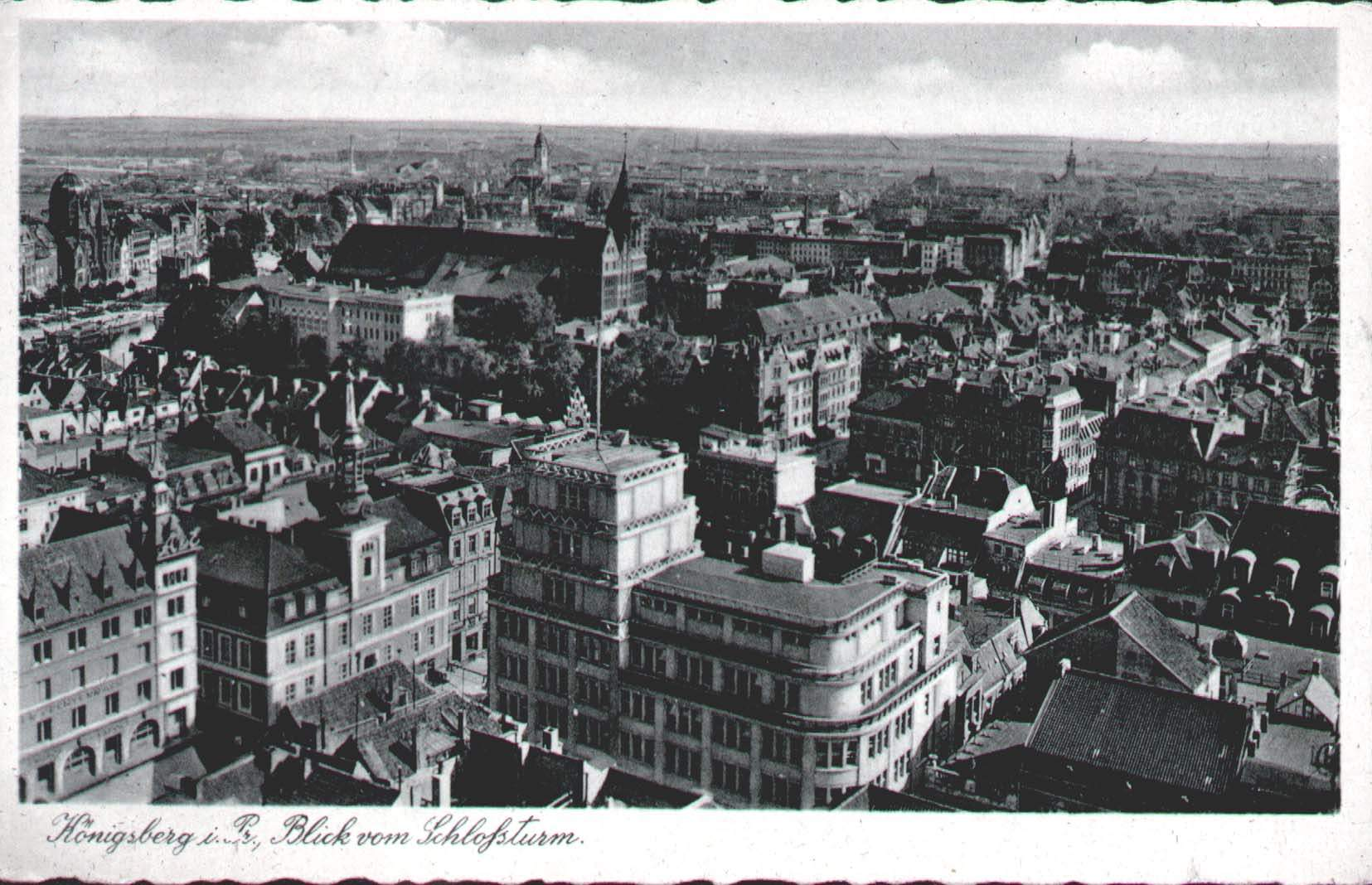
Siewert & Kiewe Office building at Altstädtischer Markt, Königsberg

Manteuffel was born in Osterode in East Prussia, German Empire (now Ostróda, Poland). He attended the Baugewerkschule, Königsberg from 1900 to 1902 and started to work as a freelance architect in 1912. He was responsible for the construction of the Siebert & Kiewe Office building at Königsberg's Altstädtischer Markt in 1928, the Disconto-Gesellschaft building at Vorstädtische Langgasse and the Alhambra cinema at Steindamm.

After the Flight and expulsion of Germans (1944–1950) Manteuffel worked in Hamburg, where he died in 1963.
