= Gustaw Gizewiusz =

Polish folklorist (1810–1848)

- Born: 21 May 1810; Pisz
- Died: 7 May 1848 (aged 37); Ostróda
- Burial place: Polska Góra cemetery, Ostróda
- Occupations: folklorist, translator, Lutheran pastor

Gustaw Herman Marcin Gizewiusz, or Gustav Gisevius (21 May 1810 – 7 May 1848) was a Polish political figure, folklorist, and translator. He was married to a Mazur Polish woman, who encouraged him to become a political figure. He was born in Pisz (Johannisburg). From 1835 he was also an Evangelical-Lutheran pastor in Ostróda.

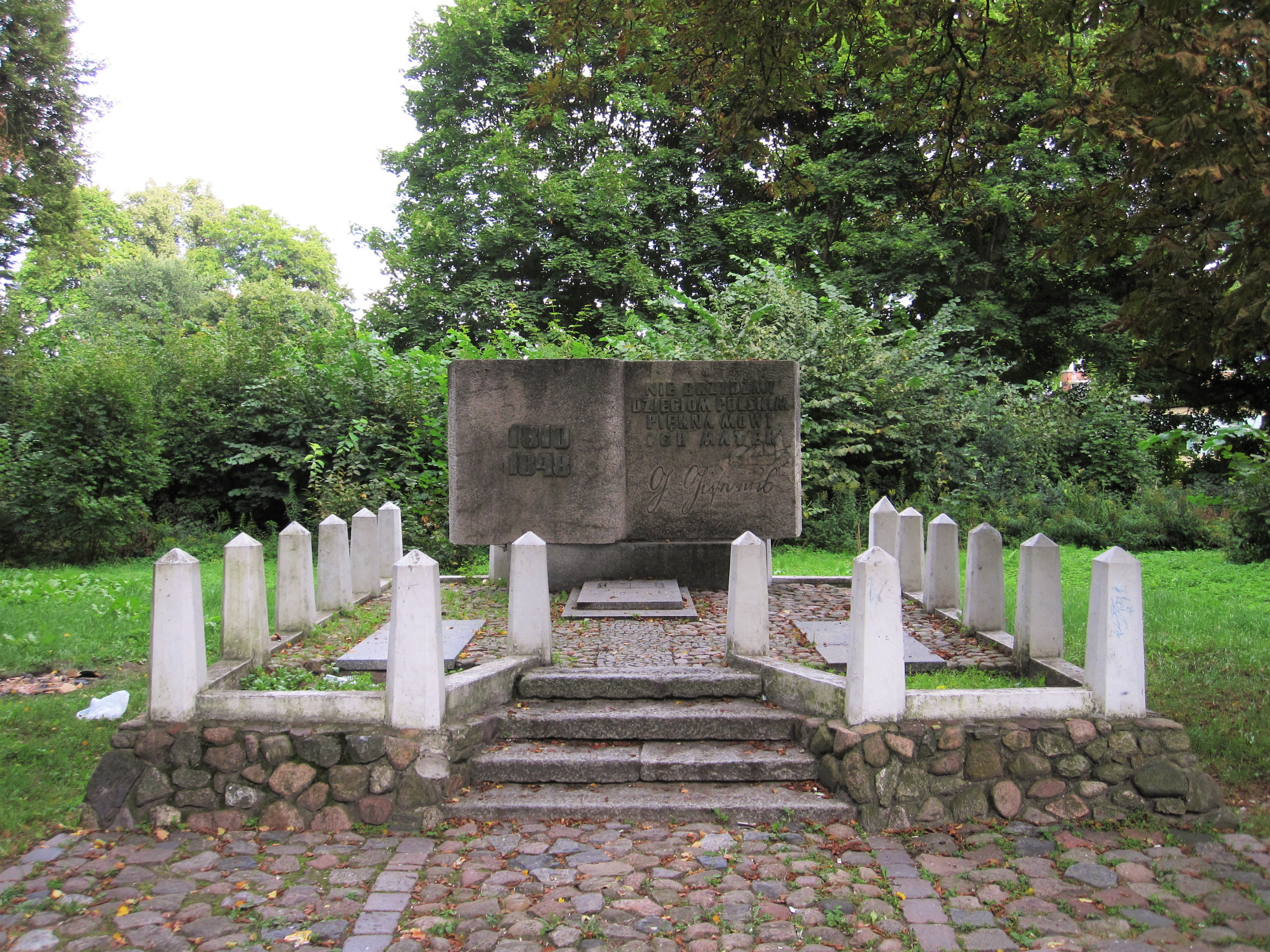
Grave of Gustaw Gizewiusz in Ostróda

In the 19th century a Polish national revival begun in the areas of the partitioned state as well as in those territories that were lost to Poland before the partitions (Silesia, Farther Pomerania). In Masurian area - which was under Polish suzerainty until the 17th century - there was a Polish linguistic, though not yet widespread political revival. The local Prussian authorities were hostile to the movement and, beginning in the 1830s, attempted to eradicate the Polish language from schools in Masuria. The authorities' efforts however failed to bring the effects expected by the Prussian state. The defending action of the Polish population during the first half of the 19th century was led by Krzysztof Celestyn Mrongowiusz and Gizewiusz who became involved in the movement to counteract Germanization in Masuria. He encouraged the Mazurs to maintain their Polish language and culture by publishing Polish-language texts for use in schools. He also recorded Mazurian folk songs which were later published in Oskar Kolberg's Dzieła Wszystkie. He died in Ostróda (Osterode). In his honor, Łuczany (Lec, Lötzen), his ancestor's hometown, was renamed Giżycko.
