= Ostróda =

City in Warmian-Masurian Voivodeship, Poland

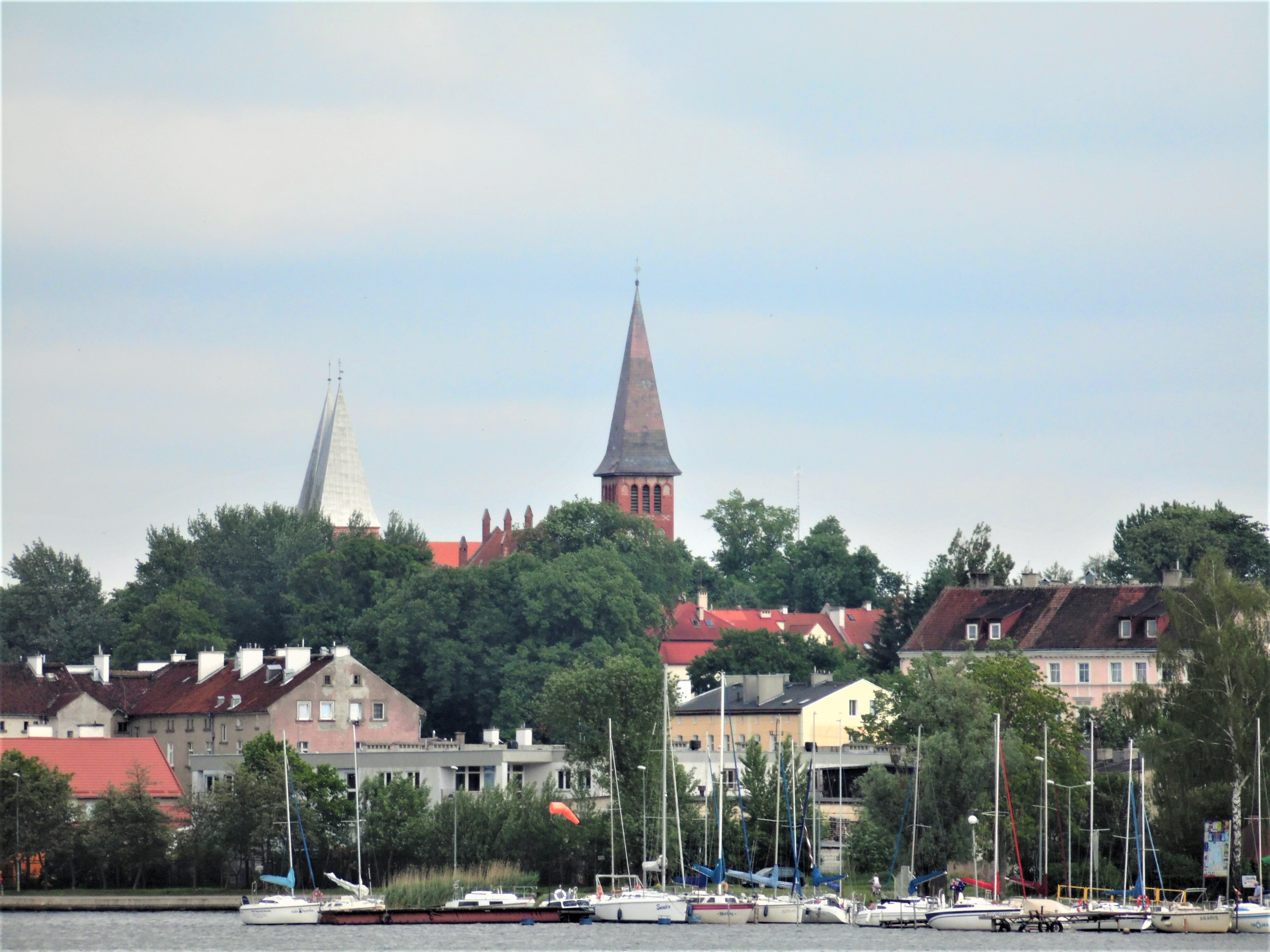
- Skyline with the Evangelical church

- Flag Coat of arms

- Location within Poland
- Coordinates: 53°42′N 19°58′E
- Country: Poland
- Voivodeship: Warmian-Masurian
- County: Ostróda
- Gmina: Ostróda (urban gmina)
- Established: 13th century
- Town rights: 1329

Government
  - Mayor: Zbigniew Michalak

Area
  - Total: 14.15 km^{2} (5.46 sq mi)
- Highest elevation: 120 m (390 ft)
- Lowest elevation: 110 m (360 ft)

Population (2009)
  - Total: 33,191
  - Density: 2,346/km^{2} (6,075/sq mi)
- Time zone: UTC+1 (CET)
  - Summer (DST): UTC+2 (CEST)
- Postal code: 14-100
- Area code: +48 89
- Car plates: NOS
- Climate: Dfb
- Website: http://www.ostroda.pl

Ostróda [ɔsˈtruda] (German: Osterode in Ostpreußen) is a town in northern Poland, in the ethnocultural region of Masuria. It is the seat of the Ostróda County within the Warmian-Masurian Voivodeship and has approximately 33,191 inhabitants (2009).

Ostróda is the largest town in the western part of Masuria, and the second largest in all of Masuria after Ełk.

== Geography ==
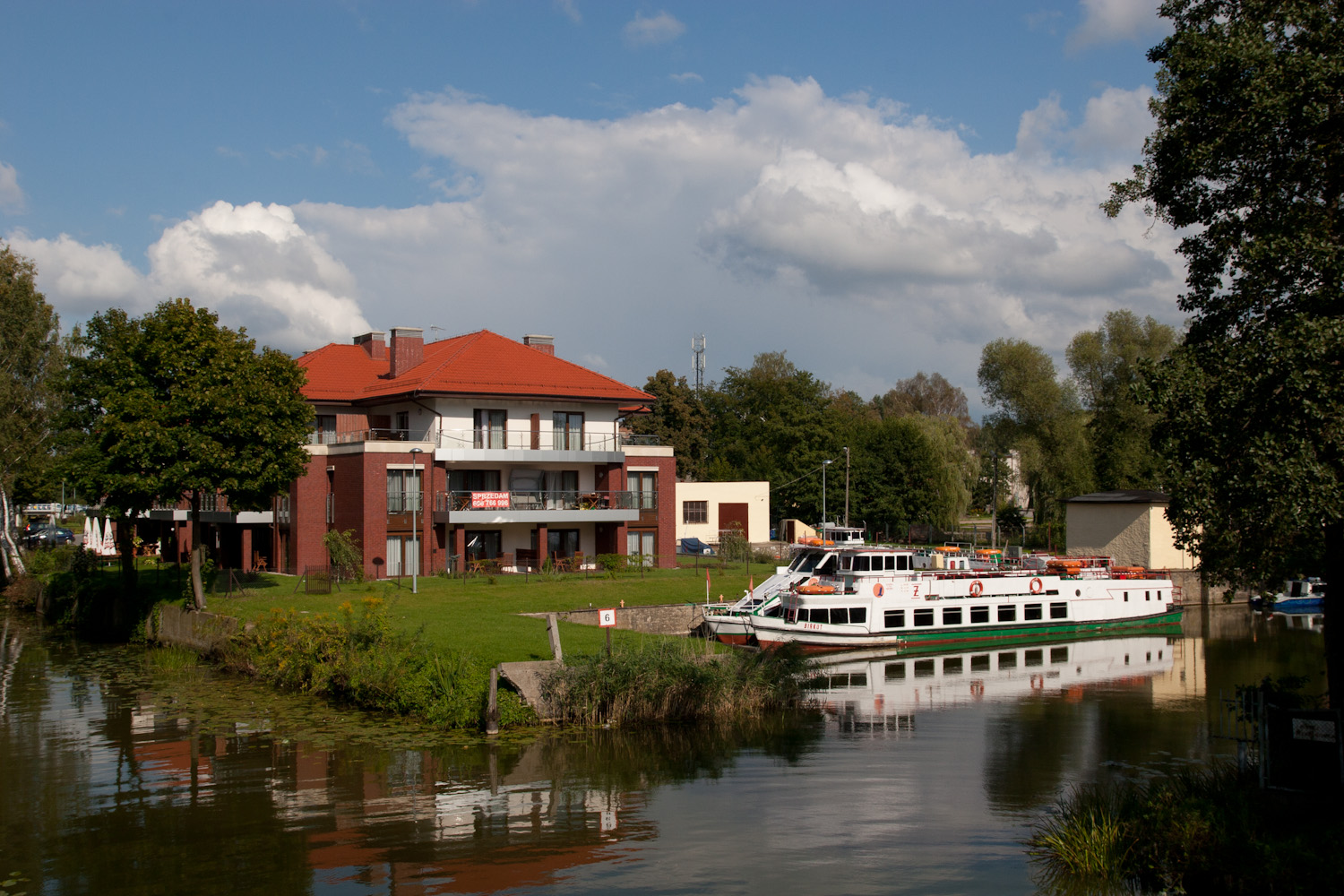
The Elbląg Canal in Ostróda

The town lies in the west part of the Masuria region on the Drwęca river, a right tributary of the Vistula. Lake Drwęca west of the town is part of the Masurian Lake District. Ostróda has become a growing tourist site owing to its relaxing natural surroundings.

The National road 7 from Gdańsk to Warsaw, part of European route E77, passes through Ostróda. The Elbląg Canal connects Ostróda with the Baltic coast.

== History ==
=== Middle Ages ===
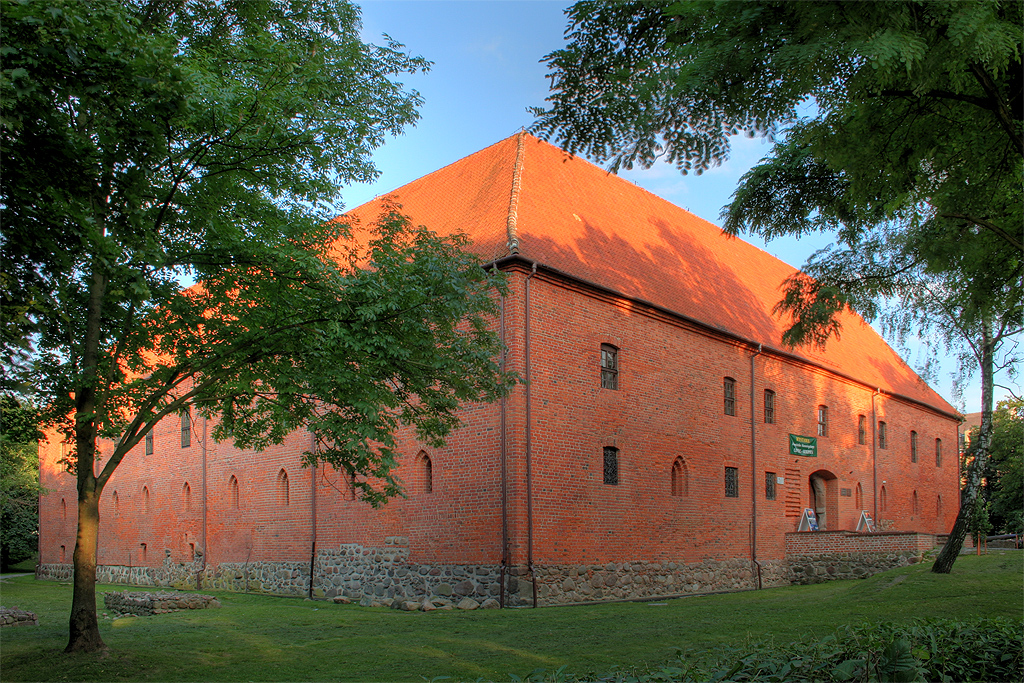
Ostróda Castle

At the site of an original settlement of Old Prussians on an island at the river delta where the Drwęca river flows into Lake Drwęca the town of Ostróda evolved. In 1270 the Teutonic Order began constructing wooden earthworks to control the original settlement as well as defend the initial Polish and German settlers. The knights named the new town Osterode after Osterode am Harz in present-day Lower Saxony, Germany (now a sister city with Ostróda). Between 1349-1370 the Order replaced the wood-and-earth fort with a stone castle. The town, whose charter traditionally dates to 1335, quickly became a regional administrative center for the Order.

After the Battle of Grunwald in 1410, Claus von Doringe conquered the castle and delivered the town to the victorious Polish King Władysław II Jagiełło. The Polish king brought the body of Ulrich von Jungingen there before travelling to besiege Marienburg (Malbork); the regrouping Teutonic Knights recaptured Osterode a few months later.

In 1440, local nobility co-founded the anti-Teutonic Prussian Confederation, upon the request of which the town was incorporated to the Kingdom of Poland by King Casimir IV Jagiellon in 1454. During the subsequent Thirteen Years' War (1454–1466), the town was repeatedly captured by both the Poles and Prussian Confederation on one side and the Teutonic Knights on the other. After the peace treaty signed in Toruń in 1466 it formed part of Poland as a fief held by the Teutonic Order.

=== Modern era ===
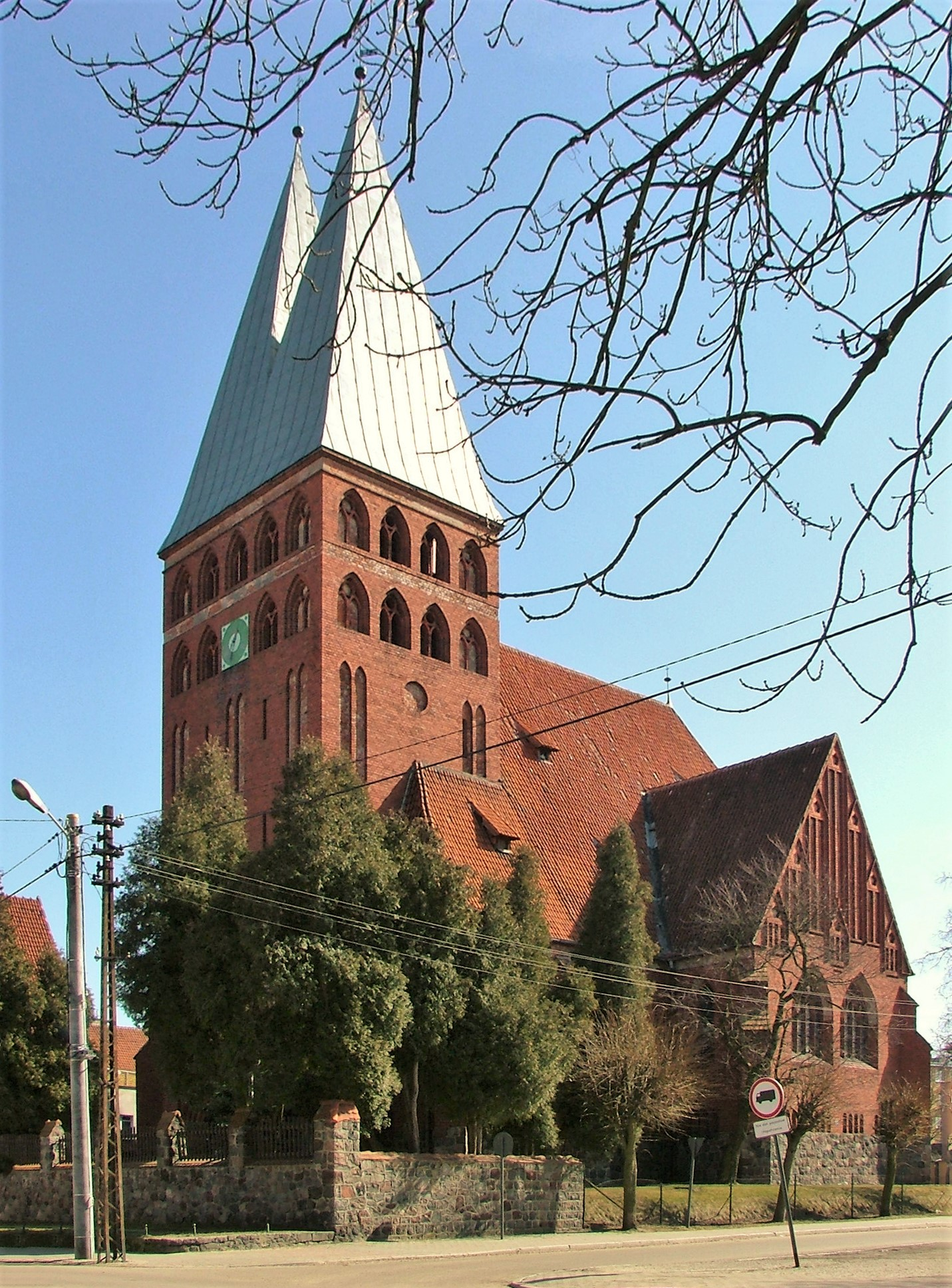
Evangelical church

From 1525 until 1701 Osterode was part of Ducal Prussia, a fief of Poland until 1657, and after 1701 part of Kingdom of Prussia. In the 17th century and until the 19th century the town and its surroundings were inhabited mostly by Poles. The majority of inhabitants were Protestant and the Evangelical church books date back to 17th century. During the Polish–Swedish War of 1626–1629, Polish troops were stationed there in 1626, and in 1628, the town was briefly occupied by the Swedes. From 1633, with the approval of the Polish King Władysław IV Vasa, Osterode and the county was under the administration of Duke John Christian of Brieg, one of the last dukes of the Piast dynasty (until his death in 1639).

After the Battle of Eylau in February 1807 French troops gathered in Osterode, from February to April 1807 Napoleon I used the castle as his headquarter. In June 1807 Polish troops of General Józef Zajączek were stationed in the town. In 1818 it became the seat of a Kreis (district) within the Kingdom of Prussia. In 1871 Osterode was included in the newly formed German Empire.

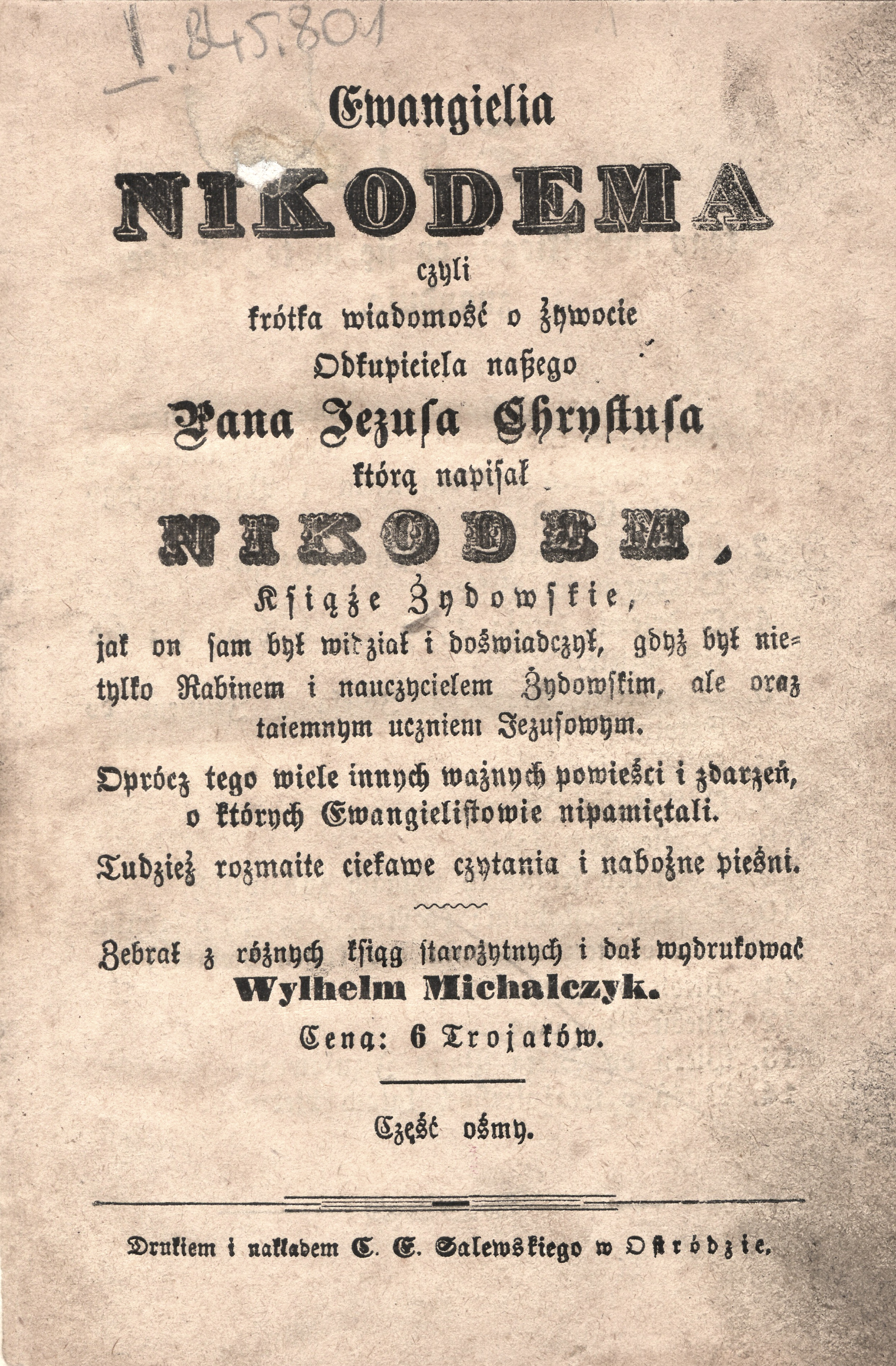
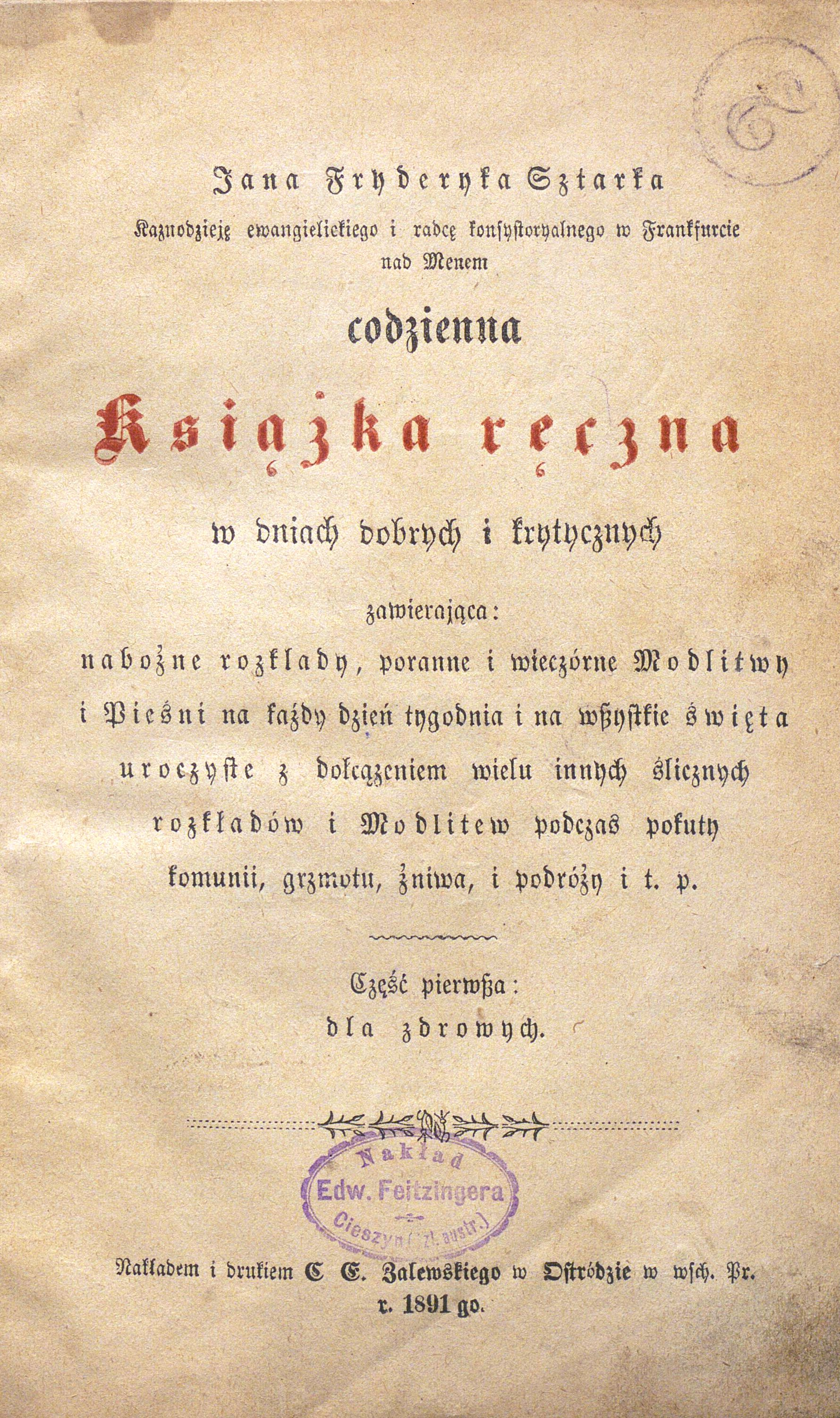
19th-century Polish publications from Ostróda

In the 19th century the town was part of territory dominated by the Polish language, and the Osterode district was inhabited mostly by Poles (71% in 1825, 65% in 1867). The town was a significant Polish centre, whose most famous representative was pastor Gustaw Gizewiusz. Polish newspapers were edited and published in the town, including Mazur from 1885. In 1868 Karol Salewski established a Polish bookshop and a Polish printing house. Osterode was the largest town of Masuria in the early 20th century (according to data from 1905 and 1925), after surpassing Lyck (Ełk) (according to data from 1880 and 1890).

During World War I and the 1914 Battle of Tannenberg, General Paul von Hindenburg had his 8th Army headquarters at the Osterode schoolhouse. In the East Prussian plebiscite of 1920 8,663 inhabitants voted to remain in German East Prussia, 17 votes supported Poland.

During World War II, the German Nazi administration operated three forced labour subcamps of the Stalag I-B prisoner-of-war camp in the town. Some expelled Poles from Lubawa County were enslaved by the Germans as forced labour in the town's vicinity. Most of the Osterode citizens had fled during the evacuation of East Prussia, when on 21 January 1945 Osterode was captured by the Soviet Red Army without fighting. However, about 70% of the town was destroyed by arson attacks afterwards. With the conquest by the Soviet Union and the Potsdam Agreement, the town became again part of Poland and most of the remaining German population was expelled. In 1950 26 percent of the population originated from the eastern areas of pre-war Poland, 18 percent were pre-war inhabitants.

While it was previously in Olsztyn Voivodeship from 1975 to 1998, Ostróda has been situated in the Warmian-Masurian Voivodeship since 1999.

==== Jewish community ====
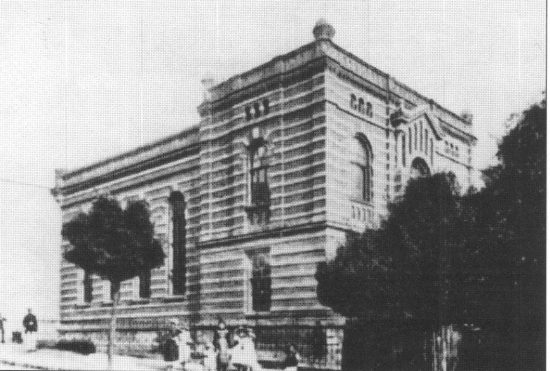
Synagogue, destroyed in 1938

The first certifiable Jewish families lived in Osterode in 1732, a Jewish cemetery was established in 1735. In 1845 the Jewish community counted about 110 members, in 1860, there were 160 and in 1880 222 Jews living in Osterode. The number declined to 123 in 1933 and 75 in 1937. A small synagogue was built in 1856 and a new, larger one based on the Bromberg (Bydgoszcz) style in 1893. In 1932 a Jewish shop was attacked with explosives, boycotts of Jewish shops took place in 1935. The synagogue and the Jewish cemetery were destroyed in the Kristallnacht riots of November 1938. In 1939, the Jewish community was officially dissolved. The remaining pre-war Jewish population was murdered by Nazi Germany in the Holocaust.

== Number of inhabitants by year ==
Historical population

Year	Pop.	±%
1756	1,058	—
1775	1,319	+24.7%
1778	1,539	+16.7%
1811	1,152	−25.1%
1816	2,180	+89.2%
1818	2,098	−3.8%

Year	Pop.	±%
1841	2,523	+20.3%
1871	4,571	+81.2%
1880	6,468	+41.5%
1890	9,410	+45.5%
1900	13,171	+40.0%
1910	14,434	+9.6%

Year	Pop.	±%
1925	16,482	+14.2%
1939	19,519	+18.4%
1950	12,521	−35.9%
1960	17,738	+41.7%
2014	33,872	+91.0%

== Sports ==
The local football club is Sokół Ostróda. It competes in the lower leagues.

== International relations ==
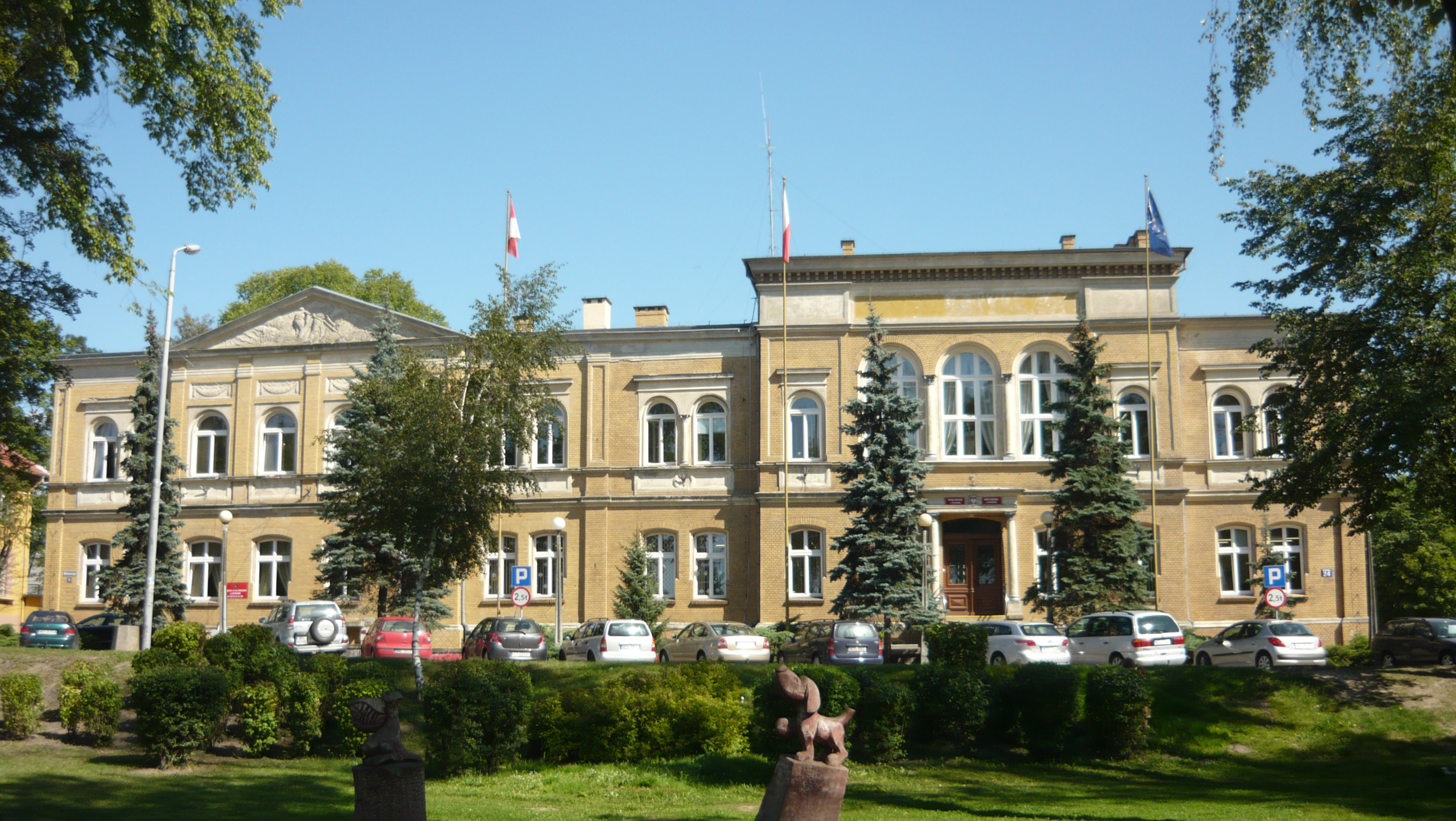
Ostróda Town Hall

=== Twin towns — Sister cities ===
Ostróda is twinned with:

- Osterode am Harz, Germany (24.04.1994)
- Neman, Russia
- Šilutė, Lithuania (27.09.2001)
- Tauragė, Lithuania

== Notable residents ==
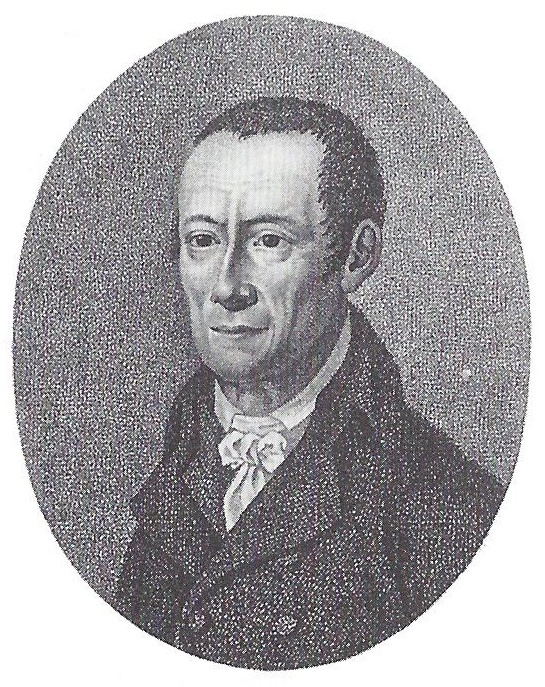
Christian Jakob Kraus

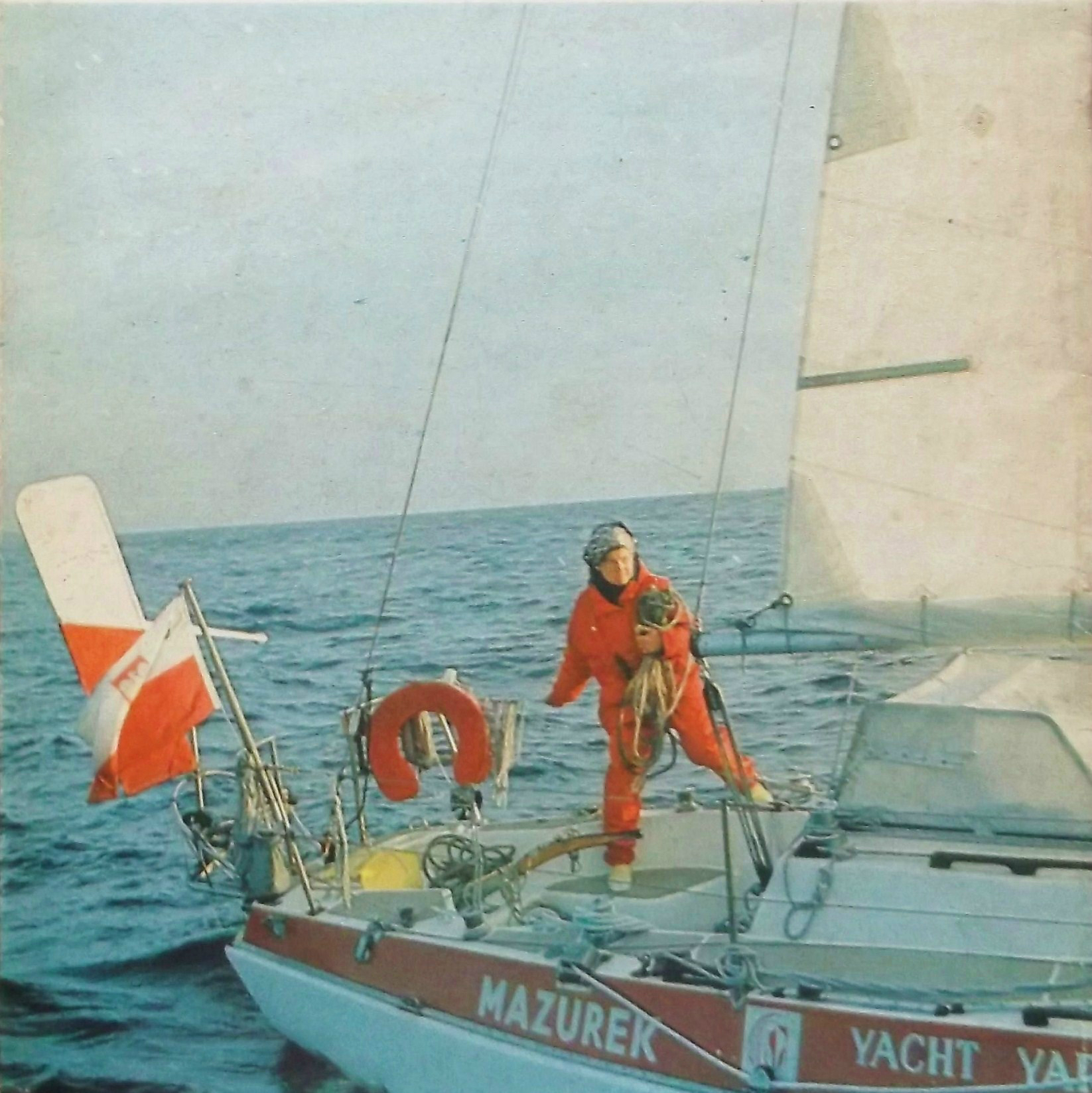
Krystyna Chojnowska-Liskiewicz

- John Christian of Brieg (1591–1639), died in Osterode
- Christian Jakob Kraus (1753–1807), philosopher, economist, linguist
- Gustaw Gizewiusz (1810–1848), Polish political figure, folklorist, translator
- Paul Dahlke (1865-1928), Physician and Buddhist
- Hans Manteuffel (1879-1963), architect
- Friedrich-Wilhelm Neumann (1889–1975), Wehrmacht officer
- Bruno Karczewski (1913–1971), Wehrmacht officer
- Hans Hellmut Kirst (1914–1989), Author
- Alexander Allerson (born 1930), German actor
- Rita Baltutt Kyle (born 1937), Author
- Werner Olk (born 1938), footballer and coach
- Kazimierz Czarnecki (born 1948), weightlifter
- Gustaw Marek Brzezin (born 1958), politician
- Patryk Czarnowski (born 1985), volleyball player
- Maciej Krzykowski, (born 1991) also known as Av3k is a professional Quake player

=== Honorary citizens ===
- Zdzisław Krzyszkowiak
- Krystyna Chojnowska-Liskiewicz
- Günter Verheugen
- Tadeusz Oracki
- Edgar Steiner
- Michal Kmiotek

== See also ==
- Dylewska Góra
