= Baugewerkschule, Königsberg =

Baugewerkschule
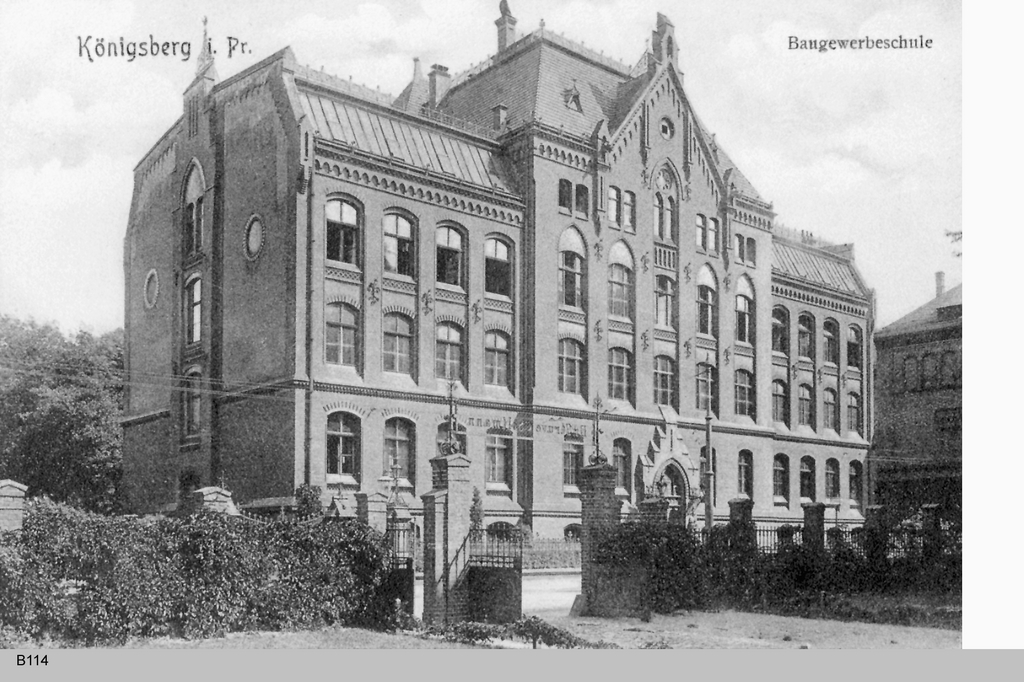
- Synagogenstraße, Vordere Vorstadt, Königsberg; Germany

Information
- Type: Building trades school
- Established: 1821
- Closed: 1945
- Enrollment: 302

The Baugewerkschule was a building trades school in Königsberg, Germany.

== History ==
The school was founded on Synagogenstraße, Vordere Vorstadt, as the Königliche Gewerbeschule (royal vocational school) in 1821. Renamed the Staatliche Baugewerkschule (state building trades school) in 1892, it was relocated to Schönstraße, Mitteltragheim, in 1897. During the school year of 1897 to 1898, the Baugewerkschule contained 232 students, most of whom were masons and carpenters, and 26 faculty. The institution was led by the architect and historian Eugen von Czihak from 1892 to 1902.

Beginning in 1914, the building housed a field hospital during World War I. It had 302 students enrolled by 1922. In 1938, it became a state technical school for structural and civil engineering. It ceased its role in 1945 as a result of World War II. The former school is now used as an administrative building in Kaliningrad, Russia.

== Notable students ==
- Hans Manteuffel (1879-1963)
- Bruno Taut (?-1901)
