= Dylewska Góra =

Mountain in Poland

- Location within Poland

Highest point
- Elevation: 312 m (1,024 ft)
- Coordinates: 53.55°N 19.9667°E

Geography
- Location: Warmian-Masurian Voivodeship, Poland
- Parent range: Wzgórza Dylewskie

Dylewska Góra (German: Kernsdorfer Höhe) is a hill located in northeastern Poland, south of the town of Ostróda, in the Warmian-Masurian Voivodeship. With elevation of 312 metres above sea level, it is one of the highest points of northern and central Poland. Dylewska Góra is a morainic hill, with its eastern and northern slopes covered by beech forest. On top there is a TV tower, as well as a 37-metre-high observation tower, which provides views of area up to 50 kilometres away.

== See also ==
- Geography of Poland
