= Drwęca =

River in northern Poland

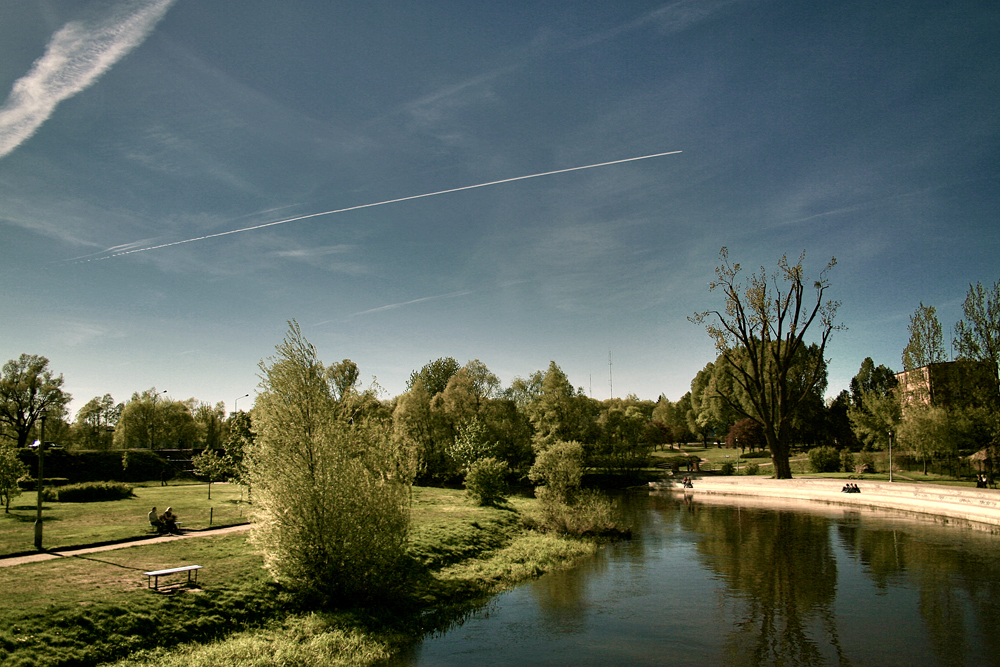

Location
- Country: Poland

Physical characteristics
- Mouth
  - location: Vistula
  - coordinates: 52°59′57″N 18°41′23″E
- Length: 241 km (150 mi)
- Basin size: 5,697 km^{2} (2,200 sq mi)
- Discharge
  - average: 30.0 m^{3}/s (1,060 cu ft/s)

Basin features
- Progression: Vistula→ Baltic Sea

The Drwęca (Polish: [ˈdrvɛnt͡sa]; German: Drewenz; Lithuanian: Druvinčia) is a river in northern Poland. It becomes a tributary of the Vistula river near the city of Toruń, forming a part of the city's administrative boundary. It has a length of 241 km and a basin area of 5,697 km^{2}, all in Poland.

Towns:

- Ostróda
- Nowe Miasto Lubawskie
- Brodnica
- Golub-Dobrzyń
- Toruń
