= Lake Niegocin =

Lake in Poland

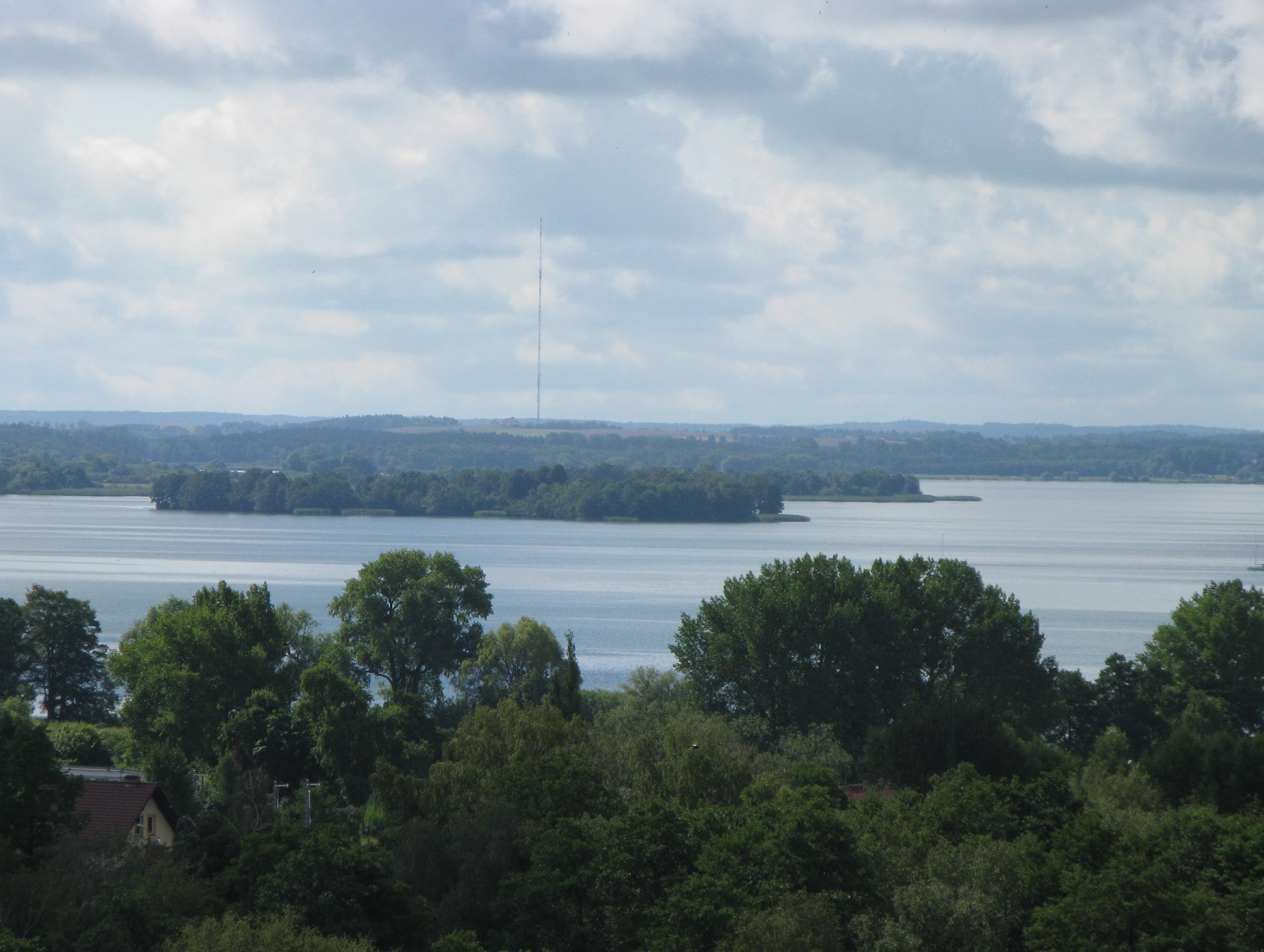

- Location within Warmian-Masurian Voivodeship Location within Poland
- Location: Masurian Lake District
- Coordinates: 53°59′0″N 21°47′5″E
- Type: glacial
- Basin countries: Poland
- Surface area: 26.04 km^{2} (10.05 sq mi)
- Average depth: 9.9 m (32 ft)
- Max. depth: 39.7 m (130 ft)
- Islands: 2

Lake Niegocin (German: Löwentinsee) is a lake in the Masurian Lake District of Poland's Warmian-Masurian Voivodeship, until 1945 part of East Prussia in Germany. It is the seventh largest lake in Poland, with an area of 26.04 square kilometres (10.05 sq mi). Maximum depth is 39.7 metres (130 ft); average is 9.9 metres (32 ft).
