= Kowalewka =

Location
- Country: Poland

Physical characteristics
- Mouth
  - location: Pasiecka Struga
  - coordinates: 54°06′00″N 19°30′02″E
- Length: 4,72 km

Basin features
- Progression: Pasiecka Struga→ Drużno→ Elbląg→ Baltic Sea

Kowalewka (Bierutówka) is a river of Poland. It'is 4,72 km long and flows into the Pasiecka (Rogowska) Struga, which terminates before reaching Lake Drużno. Drużno is drained by the Elbląg river.
