= Diwanus =

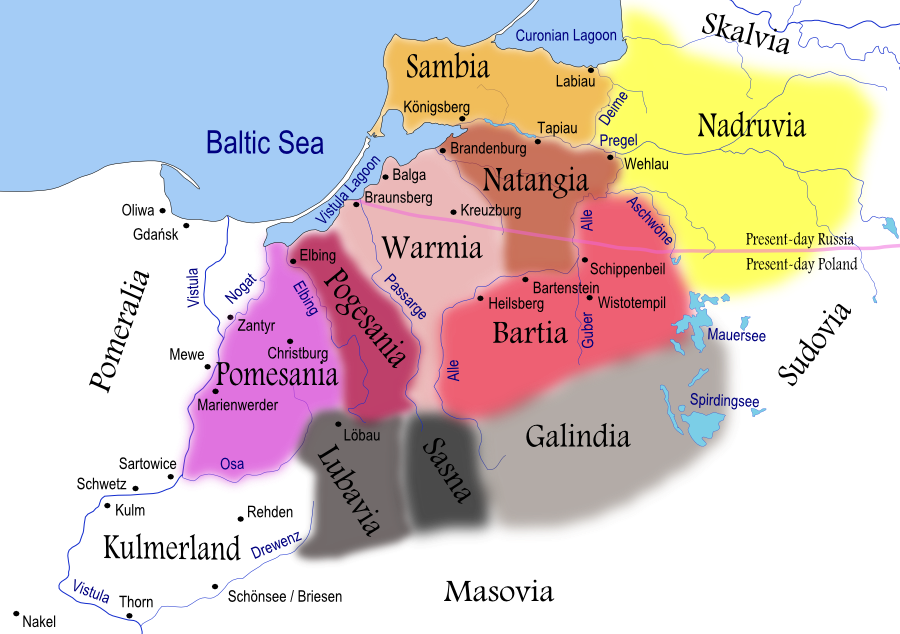
Map of Prussian clans in the 13th century

Diwanus (also Diwan, Diwane) was the leader (capitaneus) of the Bartians, one of the Prussian clans, during the Great Prussian Uprising (1260–1274) against the Teutonic Knights. He was son of Kleckis (Old Prussian: bear) and therefore is sometimes referred to by a nickname derived from the word bear.

His first major victory came when Schippenbeil fell in 1263 after almost three years of siege. Twenty knights and their men sallied out to fight the joint forces of Bartians and Sudovians in an open battle. However, the pagans blocked escape routes and all Teutons were killed. In terms of knights killed, it was one of the top ten losses by the Teutonic Knights during the 13th century. The garrison at Schippenbeil was left with too few soldiers and supplies to withstand the siege and escaped through Galindia to Masovia. Diwanus expected that fugitives would take a shorter route north to Balga or Königsberg, therefore the knights had a head start. Diwanus soon learned about the true route and, with a handful of his best men, hurried to pursue the fugitives. During a charge on the escapees, Bartians killed three knights, but Diwanus was seriously injured.

Since all major Teutonic castles in Bartia fell, Bartians did not have the need to safeguard their land from potential attacks from Teutonic strongholds. They were free to send men to help other Prussian clans. Diwanus and his men were making minor expeditions into Pogesania and Chełmno Land. In 1271, a major campaign was organized together with Pogesanian leader Linko. The Bartian infantry and Pogesanians besieged a border castle, but were fended off by the Knights from Christburg. The Prussians, who managed to escape, joined their cavalry while the Knights set up their camp on the opposite bank of the Dzierzgoń River, blocking the route home. When Christians retired for the night, one half of the Prussian army crossed the river in a distance, in order to attack the Knights from the rear, while the other half charged straight across the river. The Knights were encircled. The Battle of Paganstin saw twelve knights and 500 men killed. The Prussians immediately assaulted Christburg and almost captured it. The Prussians were still looting the surrounding area when cavalry from Elbing arrived. Many of the Prussian infantry perished while cavalry escaped. Despite these losses, Diwanus was soon back and blocked roads leading to Christburg hoping to starve the castle. Three times the Knights tried to send supplies to the castle via the Dzierzgoń River, and each time the vessels were intercepted by the Bartians. However, Christburg refused to surrender.

In 1273, Diwanus brought 800 men for a siege on Schönsee. The small outpost had only three knights and a handful of sergeants. Diwanus tried to persuade them to surrender, but they refused and tried to hide their true strength by dressing every soldier as a noble knight. When Bartians attacked, brother Arnold shot and killed Diwanus. The Bartians, left without a leader, returned home. They withdrew from the uprising, and within a year the war was lost.
