= Pogesanians =

Baltic Prussian culture

- Location of Pogesania on the map of Poland

Total population
- Extinct in 17th-18th century

Regions with significant populations

Languages
- Old Prussian, later also German and Polish

Religion
- Prussian mythology (Paganism)

Related ethnic groups
- Other Prussians and Balts

Pogesanians were a Prussian tribe, which lived in the region of Pogesania (Polish: Pogezania; Lithuanian: Pagudė; German: Pogesanien; Latin: Pogesania), a small territory stretched between the Elbląg and Pasłęka rivers, now located in the Warmian-Masurian Voivodeship, northern Poland. Pogesanians, as the rest of the Prussians, were conquered by the Teutonic Knights and became Germanized or Polonized. The old Prussian language became extinct sometime in the 17th century.

== History ==
In 1237, the Teutonic Order, who had received papal and imperial orders to conquer, Christianize the 'still heathen' Prussians, invaded the region by sea. Elbing (now Elbląg) at the (Ilfing) Elbing River (now Elbląg River) had already been founded by Hanseatic tradesmen from Lübeck. The arrival of the Teutonic Order marked the beginning of the crusade for Pogesanians, as the Knights sought to fulfill the contracts to convert the Prussians to Christianity and to govern the region of Prussia, which was given to them as their property. Pogesanians soon destroyed the city, but the Knights rebuilt it. Elbing remained as one of the Teutonic strongholds and grew to become a port and center of commerce. The city served as the base for further incursions into the Prussian territory. Pogesanians joined other Prussian clans in the First Prussian Uprising (1242–1249). However, they did not sign the Treaty of Christburg and the fighting continued until 1251 or 1252. The Pogesanians were forced to surrender to strong Teutonic reinforcements from German states.

During the Great Prussian Uprising (1260–1274), the Pogesanians elected Auktume as their leader and joined the fights. They were able to capture some smaller Teutonic castles, but the stronghold at Elbing remained a serious threat. A major battle occurred in 1271, when joint forces of Bartians led by Diwanus and Pogesanians led by Linka organized a raid into the Chełmno Land. The Battle of Pagastin saw twelve knights and 500 other Teutonic soldiers killed. The Prussians immediately assaulted Christburg (now Dzierzgoń) and almost captured it. However, soon cavalry from Elbing arrived and the Prussians were forced to escape. Pogesanians were the last clan standing in the uprising. They made a surprise raid into Elbing and ambushed its garrison. In 1274 the Knights made a great expedition to revenge this raid. They captured a stronghold at Heilsberg (Lidzbark Warmiński), the rebel headquarters, and the uprising ended.

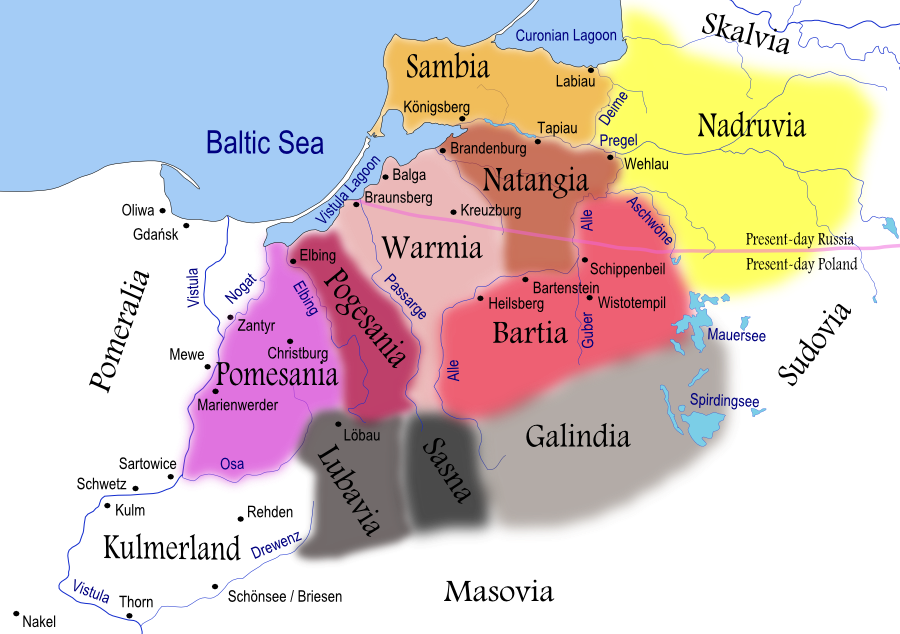
Map of Old Prussian clans in the 13th century

Pogesanians soon rose again. In 1276 news spread that Skomantas, leader of Sudovians, successfully raided Teutonic lands and, with help from Lithuanians, collected 4,000 for a raid into the Chełmno Land. However, other Prussian clans did not join the Third Uprising. Pogesanians were soon suppressed, and some of their survivors relocated to the Grand Duchy of Lithuania. The last attempt at freedom was made in 1286, when Pogesanians and Bartians conspired to invite Duke of Rügen, grandson of Świętopełk II of Pomerania, to free them from the Knights. Many of the natives were turned into serfs and the Knights invited German colonists to repopulate the land. As time passed Germans and Poles outnumbered the Prussians, and after centuries of assimilation Prussian identity ceased to exist. In 1454, the region along with the city of Elbląg was incorporated by King Casimir IV Jagiellon to the Kingdom of Poland, which was confirmed after the subsequent Thirteen Years' War, the longest of all Polish–Teutonic wars, in 1466.

== Etymology ==
According to Georg Gerullis, the name of the clan is derive from the Prussian word Pagudian: pa, meaning near, and gudde, meaning bush. The Latin name, also widely used today in English, is derived from Polish name pogedzańe. In Prussian mythology, each of the ten original lands of Prussia is named after one of the sons of King Widewuto; but only a few of the sons' names are actually given. Thus, the Germans created folk etymology for the land (in German commonly called Hockerland or Hoggerland) traced to a King Hoggo. Pogesania was said to trace to his daughter, Pogesana. His other daughter, Cadina, lent her name to the town of Cadinen (now Kadyny).
