= Battle of Pagastin =

1271 battle between the Teutonic Knights and Old Prussians

- Part of the Great Prussian Uprising
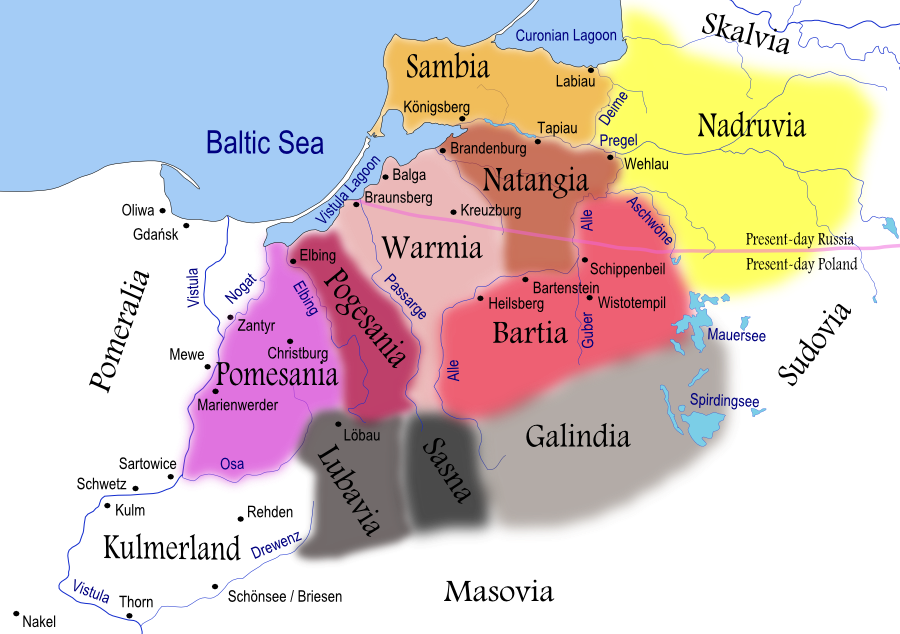
- Prussian tribes in the 13th century
Date	1271
Location	Near Pagastin village on the Dzierzgoń River
Result	Stalemate, both side suffered losses

Belligerents
Prussians (Bartians and Pogesanians)	Teutonic Knights

Commanders and leaders
Diwanus and Linka	?

Casualties and losses
Unknown	12 knights and 500 soldiers killed

Battle of Pagastin was a medieval battle fought between the Teutonic Knights and Prussians in 1271 during the Great Prussian Uprising (1260–1274). Pagan Prussians rose against their conquerors, who tried to convert them to Christianity, after Lithuanians and Samogitians defeated the joint forces of the Teutonic Knights and the Livonian Order in the Battle of Durbe in 1260. The first years of the uprising were successful for the Prussians, but the Knights received reinforcements from Western Europe and were gaining the upper-hand in the conflict.

The Prussians launched raids against the Chełmno Land, where the Knights first established themselves in late 1220s. The apparent aim of these raids were to force the Knights to devote as many troops in defense of Chełmno as possible so that they could not organize raids deep into Prussian territory. As other clans became preoccupied fending off Teutonic attacks from their forts, only Diwanus and his Bartians were able to continue the war in the west. They made several minor expeditions to Chełmno Land each year.

The major Prussian offensive was organized in 1271 together with Linka, leader of the Pogesanians. The Bartian infantry and Pogesanians besieged a border castle, but were fended off by the Knights from Christburg. The Prussians who managed to escape joined their cavalry while the Knights set up a camp on the opposite bank of the Dzierzgoń River, blocking the route home. When Christians retired for the night, half of the Prussian army crossed the river at a distance, in order to attack the Knights from the rear, while the other half charged straight across the river. The Knights were encircled. The Battle of Paganstin saw twelve knights and 500 men killed. The Prussians immediately assaulted Christburg and almost captured it. The Prussians were still looting the surrounding area when cavalry from Elbing arrived. Many of the Prussian infantry perished while cavalry escaped. Despite these losses, Diwanus was soon back and blocked roads leading to Christburg hoping to starve the castle.
