= Kaup (emporium) =

Coordinates: 54.9316°N 20.4735°E

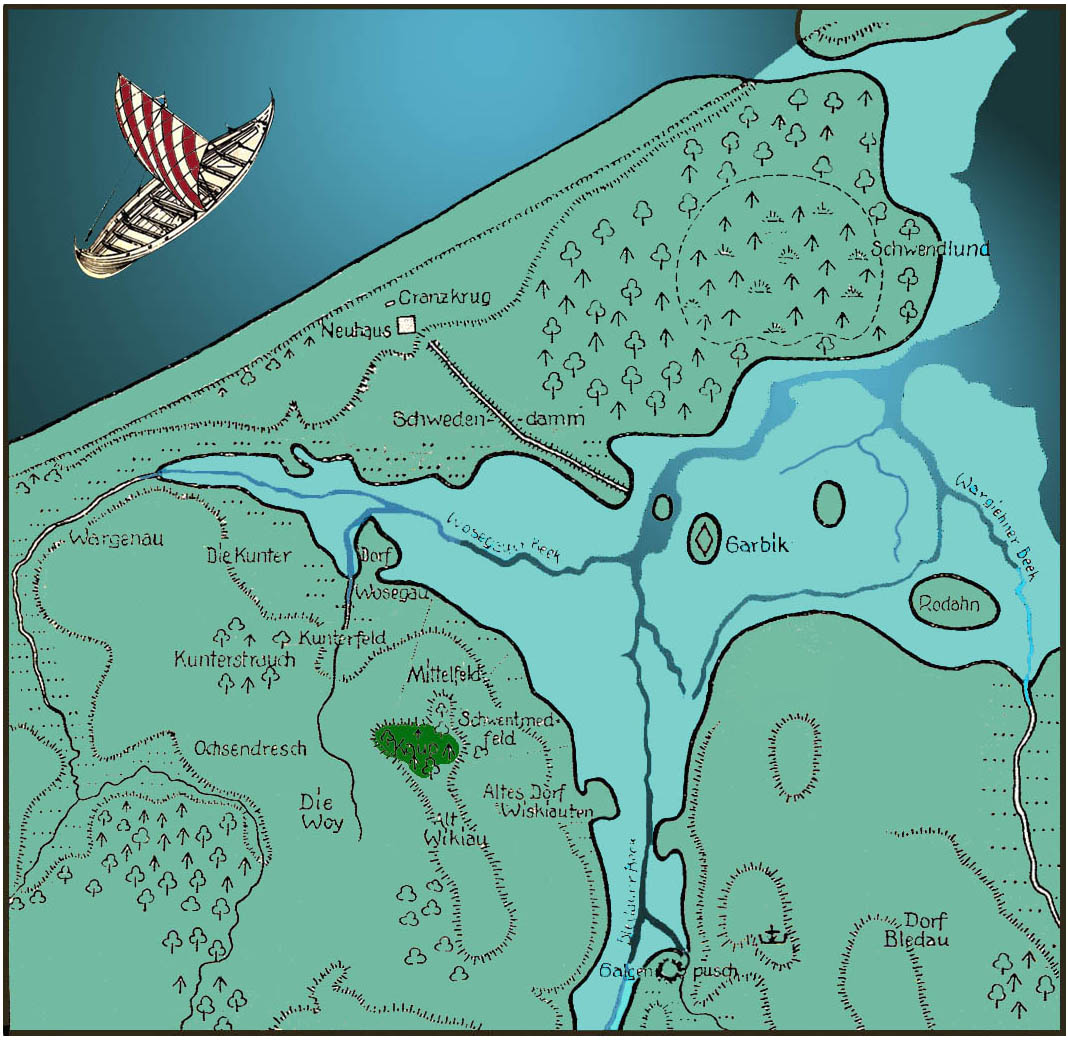
A map of the site

Kaup is a hill on the bank of the Curonian Lagoon, immediately north of the village of Mokhovoye, Kaliningrad Oblast, Russia. It is a large early medieval burial site with Norse grave goods. Kaup has been viewed by historians as an important early medieval emporium and a likely starting point of the Amber Road to the south. The original name of this medieval settlement is uncertain.

It is also the birthplace of Baltic chieftain Caupo, who descended from Swedish Varangian tradesmen.

== History ==
Archaeological excavations, undertaken in 1899 and 1932, when the area was a part of East Prussia, and in 1979, during Soviet times, suggest that a major center of Old Prussians sprang up there in the early 9th century. Kaup may have been its name, because the place-name is cognate to Old Prussian (and Germanic) terms for "purchase". Marija Gimbutas describes it as

the gateway for the traffic leading to the east via the lower Nemunas basin into the lands of the Curonians, Lithuanians, and other Baltic tribes.

Following the decline of Truso to the south and Grobin to the north in the course of the century, Kaup succeeded them as the principal regional colony of Swedish merchants from Birka. It was superbly sited along the sand-barred shore particularly rich in amber, hidden from potential enemies within a bay "where islands, shoals, and complicated channels made the approach slow and observable".

Kaup flourished as a market town protected by a garrison until the end of the 10th century, when Harald Bluetooth's son, Haakon, a Dane, raided Samland. This attack, attested by Saxo Grammaticus, probably contributed to the downfall of Kaup, which was again burned to the ground by the Dane Cnut the Great during his anti-Prussian raid in 1016. The Norsemen's raids ended in the 11th century. They abandoned the Curonian shore for good, but the Prussians continued to occupy the site until the Northern Crusades of the 13th century.

== Archaeology ==
In a forest skirting the modern settlement, German archaeologists of the 19th century found a large cemetery, consisting of up to five hundred tumuli. Of these, only a few remain: continuing activities of amateur Russian archaeologists approach vandalism in that they result in razing of several tumuli each summer. The finds unearthed at Kaup highlight Swedish rather than Danish connections of the medieval Scandinavian colonists.

The tumuli are semi-spherical, less than 1 meter (3 ft 3 in) in height and ranging from 5 to 12 meters (16 to 39 ft) in diameter. A huge boulder was placed on top of each barrow. Some burial mounds were surrounded by stone rings. The Vikings were cremated elsewhere, together with their swords and arrows, before ashes of the dead and their burnt weapons were deposited inside the barrows.
