= Auctume =

Auctume or Auktume (baptized as Nicholas or Nikolaus) was the leader of Pogesanians, one of the Prussian clans, during the Great Prussian Uprising (1260–1274) against the Teutonic Knights. There is nothing known about his life or achievements, except that once the uprising started, Pogesanians elected him as their leader. It is known that in 1271 Pogesanians were led by Linka in the Battle of Pagastin. This could indicate that Auktume died before the campaign.
