= Amber Coast =

Baltic Sea coastline region of Russia

Coordinates: 54.827°N 19.966°E

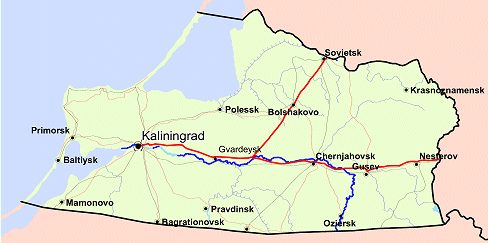
The Sambia Peninsula, Bay of Gdańsk and Vistula Lagoon; the area of the "Amber Coast"

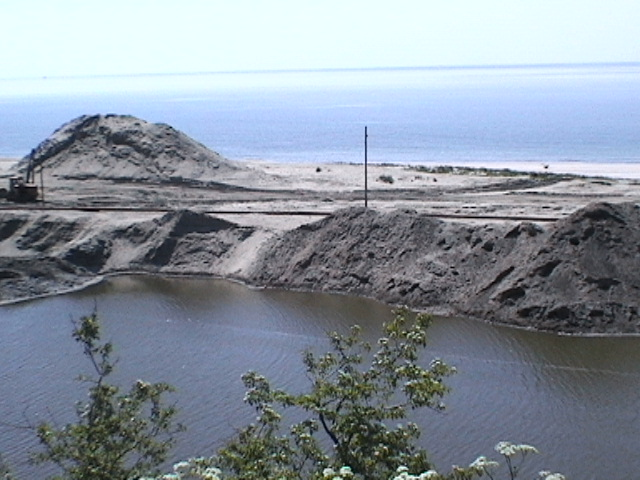
Open-pit mining near Jantarny (Sambia Peninsula, Kaliningrad Oblast, Russia)

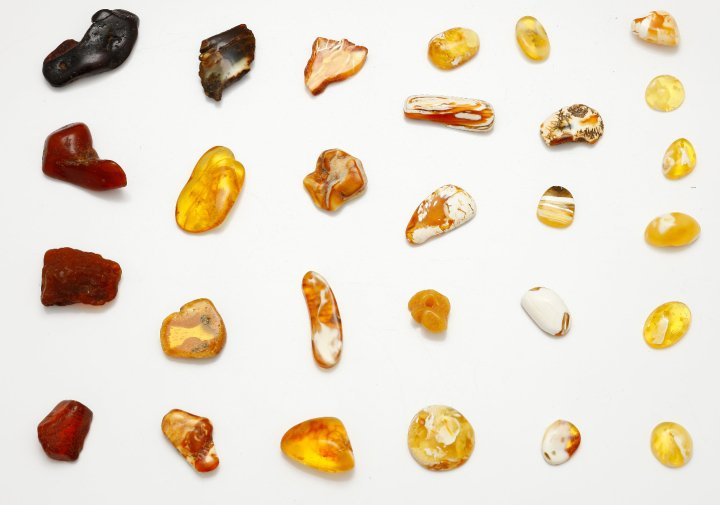
Different colours of Baltic amber.

The Amber Coast is a coastal strip of the Baltic Sea in the northwest of Kaliningrad (Russia, Kaliningrad Oblast, Sambia Peninsula, formerly northern East Prussia in Germany). In this area amber (Baltic amber) has been excavated since the mid-19th century and up to today in open-pit mining. Two deposits – Palmnikenskoe and Primorskoe, containing 80% of world amber reserves, were found near Yantarny on the Western coast of the Sambia Peninsula in 1948-1951's.

== History ==
Scientists believe that amber was deposited during the Upper Eocene and Lower Oligocene in a delta of a prehistoric river, in a shallow part of a marine basin. In addition to the coast near Kaliningrad, amber is also found elsewhere in the Baltic Sea region. The deposits are found mostly in the "blue earth glauconite", a layer 1 to 17.5 meters thick found 25 to 40 meters from the surface. In addition to the Sambia region, amber is gathered in noticeable amounts at German, Polish and Lithuanian Baltic beaches (areas of the Bay of Gdańsk as well as the Vistula Lagoon), the western coast of Denmark and the Frisian Islands. Small amounts of Baltic amber can even be found outside the Baltic region, for example on the coastline of the south east of England.

However, about 90% to 98% of all output of amber has been produced in the Sambia region (now a Russian exclave, formerly in Eastern Prussia and the Polish–Lithuanian Commonwealth). The Sambian amber-producing region is a square of about 30–40 km (19–25 mi), although geologists estimate there are deposits beyond the region of the main excavations. A potential nearby source of amber is the Courish Lagoon. Amber excavation is overseen by the Russian Amber Company (Ruskij Jantar).

The Amber Coast is mentioned as early as by Tacitus in his work Germania (ch.45):

"At this point the Suevic sea, on its eastern shore, washes the tribes of the Æstii, whose rites and fashions and style of dress are those of the Suevi, while their language is more like the British. They worship the mother of the gods, and wear as a religious symbol the device of a wild boar. This serves as armour, and as a universal defence, rendering the votary of the goddess safe even amidst enemies. They often use clubs, iron weapons but seldom. They are more patient in cultivating corn and other produce than might be expected from the general indolence of the Germans. But they also search the deep, and are the only people who gather amber (which they call “glesum”), in the shallows, and also on the shore itself. Barbarians as they are they have not investigated or discovered what natural cause or process produces it. Nay, it even lay amid the sea's other refuse, till our luxury gave it a name. To them it is utterly useless; they gather it in its raw state, bring it to us in shapeless lumps, and marvel at the price which they receive. It is however a juice from trees, as you may infer from the fact that there are often seen shining through it, reptiles, and even winged insects, which, having become entangled in the fluid, are gradually enclosed in the substance as it hardens. I am therefore inclined to think that the islands and countries of the West, like the remote recesses of the East, where frankincense and balsam exude, contain fruitful woods and groves; that these productions, acted on by the near rays of the sun, glide in a liquid state into the adjacent sea, and are thrown up by the force of storms on the opposite shores."

== Other uses ==
Another coastal strip referred to as “amber coast” is the Costa de Ambar (also known as “Costambar”) in the west of Puerto Plata (Hispaniola, Dominican Republic). In this area there are a number of small shaft mines, from which is excavated the so-called "Dominican amber". The Dominican amber production site is the world's second-largest, although compared to the Baltic region it is "a distant second".
