= Sambia Peninsula =

Peninsula in Kaliningrad Oblast, Russia

Coordinates: 54°49′58″N 20°16′09″E

Sambia is the peninsula northwest of Kaliningrad

Sambia (Russian: Самбийский полуостров, romanized: Sambiysky poluostrov, lit. 'Sambian Peninsula') or Samland (Russian: Земландский полуостров, romanized: Zemlandsky poluostrov, lit. 'Zemlandic Peninsula') or Kaliningrad Peninsula (official name, Russian: Калининградский полуостров, Kaliningradsky poluostrov) is a peninsula in the Kaliningrad Oblast of Russia, on the southeastern shore of the Baltic Sea. The peninsula is bounded by the Curonian Lagoon to the north-east, the Vistula Lagoon in the southwest, the Pregolya River in the south, and the Deyma River in the east. As Sambia is surrounded on all sides by water, it is technically an island. Historically it formed an important part of the historic region of Prussia.

== Etymology ==
Sambia is named after the Sambians, an extinct tribe of Old Prussians. Samland is the name for the peninsula in the Germanic languages. Polish and Latin speakers call the area Sambia, while the Lithuanian name is Semba.

== Geography and geology ==
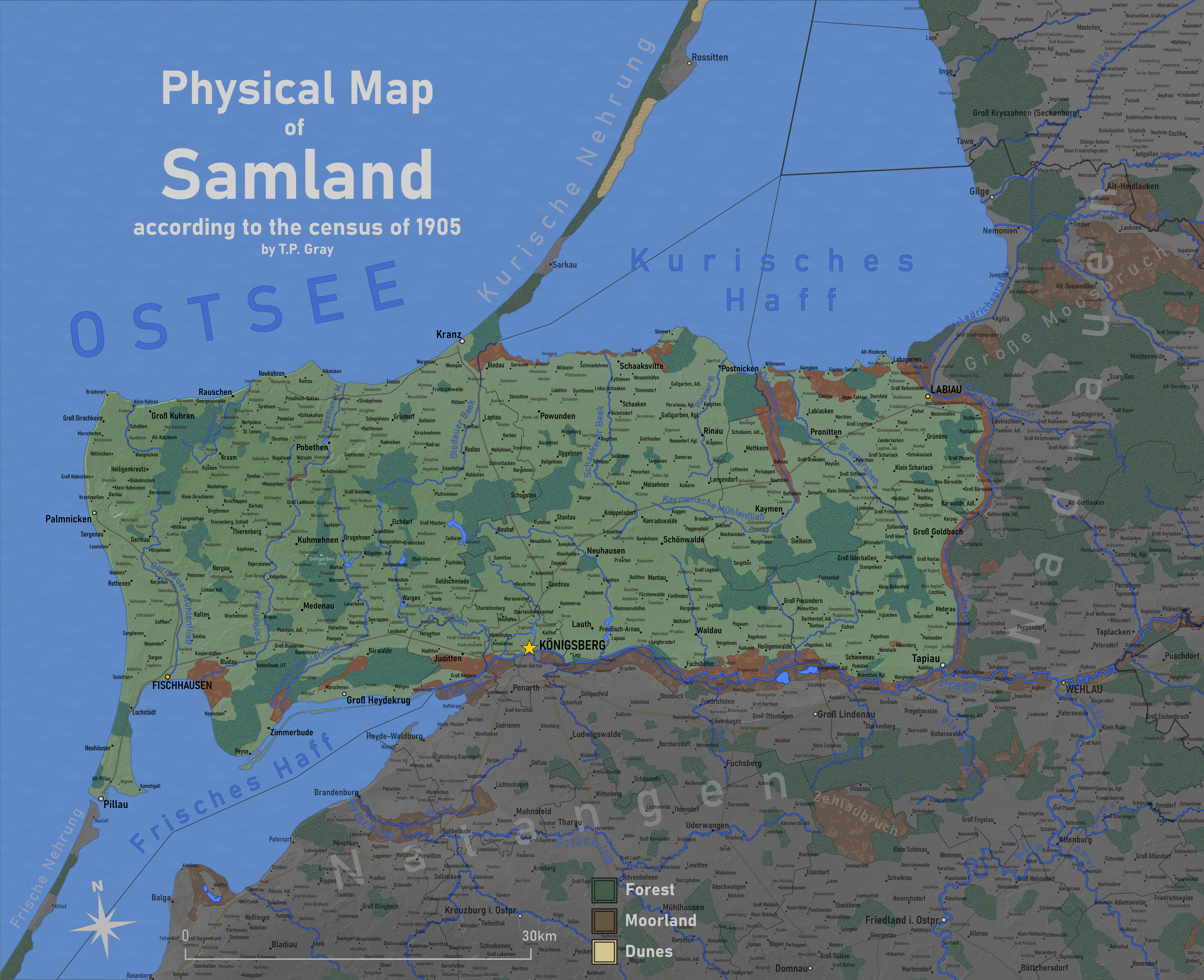
Physical Map of Samland in 1905

Baedeker describes Sambia as "a fertile and partly-wooded district, with several lakes, lying to the north of Königsberg" (since 1946 Kaliningrad). The landscape is hilly in the west, with coastal bluffs and beaches, while in the east it is low-lying and flat. The sections of coast adjacent to the Curonian and Vistula Lagoons are often swampy. Due to the moderating influence of the Baltic Sea, the climate is more mild than regions of comparable latitude further east. The highest point at 111 meters, Galtgarben, is found two kilometers southeast of Kumachyovo (German: Kumehnen).

Gvardeysk (German: Tapiau) is located at the southeastern end of the peninsula where the Deyma branches off from the Pregolya, while Polessk (German: Labiau) is found at the northeastern end, nearby where that river enters the Curonian Lagoon. The peninsula is connected to the Curonian Spit to the north, while it is separated from the Vistula Spit by the Strait of Baltiysk next to the port city of Baltiysk (German: Pillau). Sambia also includes two famous seaside resorts on its northern coast, Zelenogradsk (German: Kranz) and Svetlogorsk (German: Rauschen).

=== Amber ===
Amber has been found in the area for over two thousand years, especially on the coast near Kaliningrad. History and legends tell of the ancient trade routes known as the Amber Road leading from the Old Prussian settlements of Kaup (in Sambia) and Truso (near Elbląg, near the mouth of the Vistula) southwards to the Black and Adriatic seas. In Imperial Germany, the right to collect amber was restricted to the Hohenzollern dynasty, and visitors to Sambia's beaches were forbidden to pick up any fragments they found. Beginning in the 19th century, amber was mined on an industrial scale by the Germans before 1945 and by the Soviets / Russians thereafter at Yantarny (former German name: Palmnicken).

== History ==
Reference to the Sambia Peninsula begins with Greek traveller Pytheas, referring to an amber island called "Abalus". The name probably described the whole lagoon area known in Finnic as AVA (open expanse = lagoon) and -LA (place of) Historic scholars could not find the mysterious amber island because the Sambia Peninsula did not look like an island since the whole Baltic area that was depressed by the Ice Age glaciers has been rising many meters in the last thousands of years and was no longer looking like an island by the 10th century. Based on finds of prehistoric amber carvings, nomadic boat using hunter gatherers were attracted to the area as early as 6,000 years ago, according to archeology.

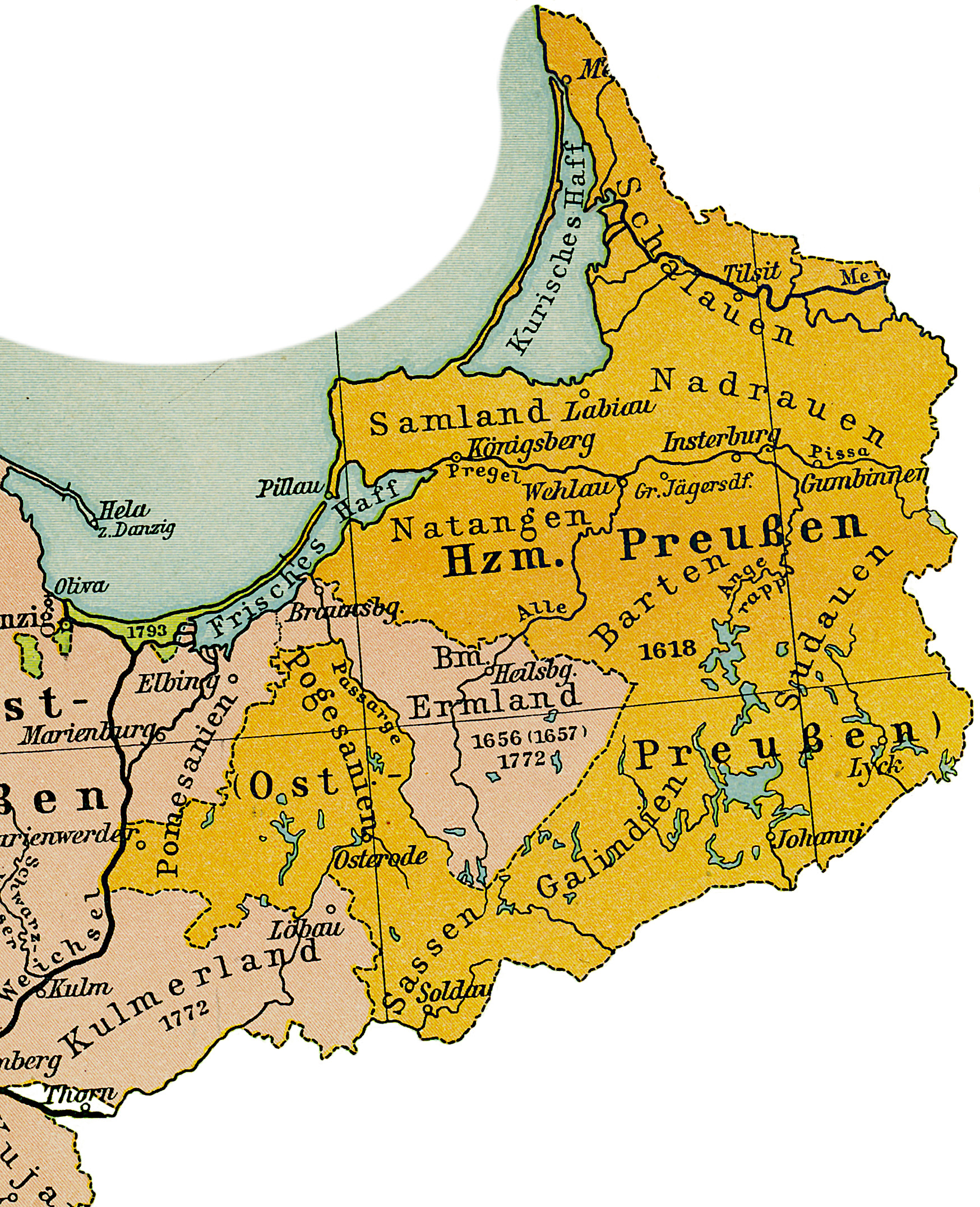
Samland in the Duchy of Prussia, ca. 1648.

Sambia was originally sparsely populated by the Sambians. The German Teutonic Knights conquered the region in the 13th century. The church administration was placed under the Bishopric of Samland, established in 1243. Settlers from the Holy Roman Empire began colonizing the region, and the Sambian Prussians gradually became assimilated. The peninsula was the last area in which the Old Prussian language was spoken before becoming extinct at the beginning of the 18th century.

In 1454, the region was incorporated by King Casimir IV Jagiellon to the Kingdom of Poland upon the request of the anti-Teutonic Prussian Confederation. After the subsequent Thirteen Years' War, since 1466, it formed part of Poland as a fief held by the Teutonic Order. The peninsula became part of the Duchy of Prussia, a vassal duchy of the Kingdom of Poland, founded when Albert of Brandenburg-Ansbach, the 37th Grand Master, secularized the Monastic State of the Teutonic Knights in 1525. The Margraviate of Brandenburg inherited the duchy in 1618 under Polish overlordship.

Because the Duchy of Prussia failed to fulfill its feudal obligations as a vassal of Poland during the Polish–Swedish wars, George William's rule in Prussia was suspended in 1635, and the Polish king replaced him with a viceroy, Jerzy Ossoliński. However, under the Treaty of Sztumska Wieś, the Duchy (and so the Sambia peninsula) was given back to George William. In 1701 the Hohenzollern ruler Frederick I proclaimed the Kingdom of Prussia, and in 1773 Sambia became part of the newly formed Province of East Prussia. In 1871, the peninsula became part of the German Empire in the course of the unification of Germany. After World War I Sambia formed part of the East Prussian province of Weimar Germany.

During World War II, the Germans operated two subcamps of the Stutthof concentration camp, and the AGSSt Samland assembly center for Allied POWs in the region. The Polish resistance movement was active in the region, with its activities including espionage of German activity and distribution of Polish underground press.

In 1945 after World War II, the Soviet Union annexed northern East Prussia, including Sambia, while the southern part of the province became again part of Poland. Sambia became part of the Soviet Kaliningrad Oblast, named after the nearby city of Kaliningrad (historically German: Königsberg), and the new authorities expelled its German inhabitants in accordance to the Potsdam Agreement.

The Soviet Union gradually repopulated the Kaliningrad Oblast, including Sambia, with Russians and Belarusians. Until the dissolution of the Soviet Union in 1991, much of the district was a closed military area.

=== Kursenieki ===
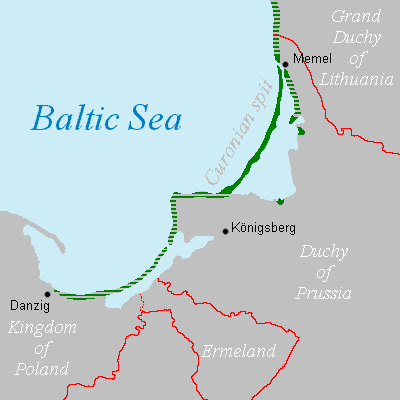
Curonian-populated area in 1649

While today the Kursenieki, also known as Kuršininkai are a nearly extinct Baltic ethnic group living along the Curonian Spit, in 1649 Kuršininkai settlement spanned from Memel (Klaipėda) to Gdańsk, Poland, including the coastline of the Sambian Peninsula. The Kuršininkai were eventually assimilated by the Germans, except along the Curonian Spit where some still live. The Kuršininkai were considered Latvians until after World War I when Latvia gained independence from the Russian Empire, a consideration based on linguistic arguments. This was the rationale for Latvian claims over the Curonian Spit, Memel, and other territories of East Prussia which would be later dropped.

== See also ==
- Amber Coast
- Curonian Lagoon
- Curonian Spit
- Vistula Lagoon
