= Witland =

Historical region in southeast Baltic region inhabited by Prussians

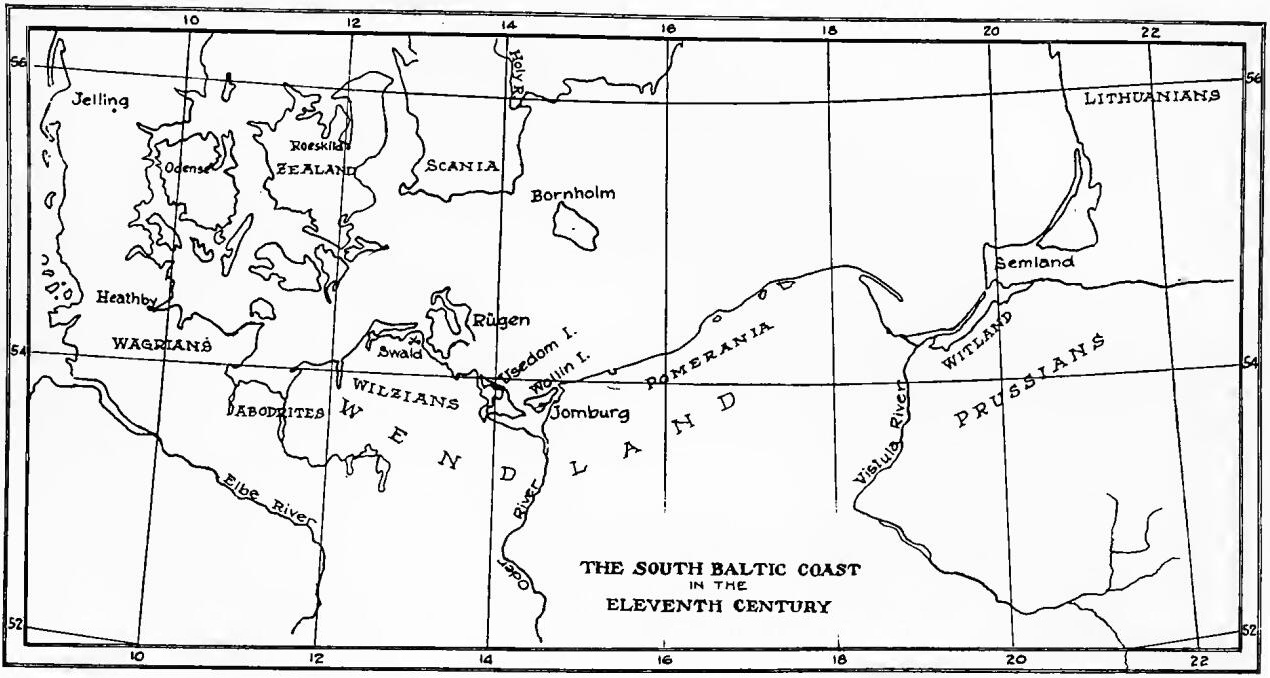
The South Baltic Coast in the 11th century

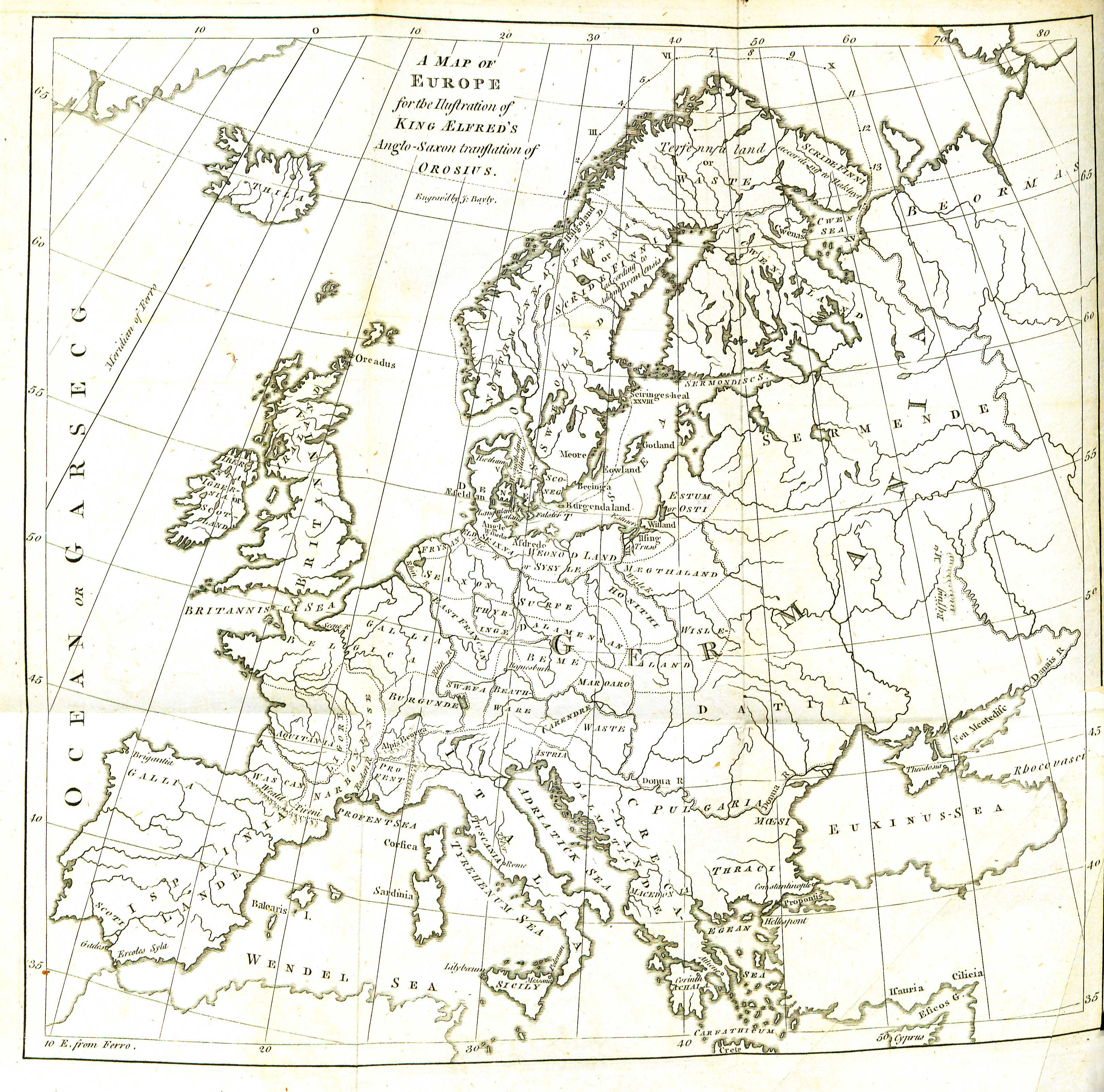
A Map of Europe for the Illustration of King Alfred's Anglo-Saxon translation of Orosius. Engraved by J. Bayly.1773

Witland is a seldom-used name for a historical region in the south-east Baltic region inhabited by Prussians (Aestii), called Estum in the text of Wulfstan. The name appears in King Alfred's adapted version of Orosius, in which the traveller Wulfstan's accounts were incorporated.

According to Wulfstan, "the Vistula is a very large river, and near it lie Witland and Weonodland (Wendland); and Witland belongs to the Esthonians."

According to the Anglo-Saxon Chronicle, in 1022, King Canute set sail for Isle of Wight (Old English: Wiht/Wihtlande). Some historians argue that the "Wiht/Wihtlande" in this case is actually Witland.
