= Aesti =

Unidentified ethnic group from northern Europe, described by Tacitus

The Aesti were located around the Baltic Sea.

The Aesti (also Aestii, Astui or Aests) were an ancient people first described by the Roman historian Tacitus in his treatise Germania (circa 98 AD). According to Tacitus, the territory of Aesti was located somewhere east of the Suiones (Swedes).

== Overview ==
Tacitus described the Aesti as having lived "upon the right of the Suevian Sea" and had the same customs and attire as the Germanic Suevi. It has been suggested that the Aesti worshipped the mother of the gods, similar to the Nerthus cult among northern Germanic peoples. Though they were most likely of Baltic origin, they had extensively intermingled with the neighbouring Gothic tribes.

Tacitus wrote that the Aesti were "the only people who collect amber—glaesum is their own word for it—in the shallows or even on the beach". Glaesum, an apparently Latinised word for amber (in Latin, sucinum), is the only surviving example of the Aestian language. The word is thought to be of Germanic origin, given its similarity to the Gothic word glas. Tacitus, however, describes the language of the Aestii as closer to that spoken in Britain than those of other neighbouring tribes.

The Old Prussian and modern Lithuanian names for the Vistula Lagoon, Aīstinmari and Aistmarės, respectively, appear to derive from Aesti and mari ("lagoon" or "fresh-water bay"), which suggests that the area around the lagoon had links with the Aesti.

== Historical sources ==
=== Tacitus ===
The approximate location of the Aesti purported by the Roman historian Tacitus, northeast of the Roman Empire near the Baltic Sea.

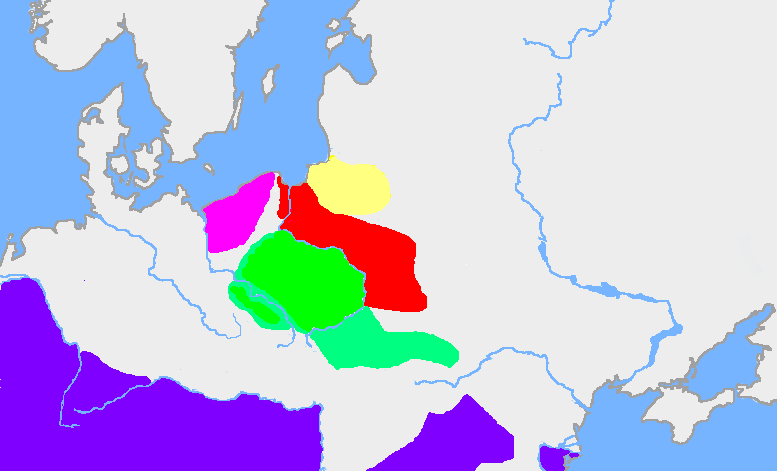
In the first half of the 3rd century, a Baltic culture, likely the Aesti, occupied in the area in yellow. The Roman Empire is shown in purple, the red area represents the extent of the Wielbark culture, green the Przeworsk culture, and pink the Debczyn culture.

The writers of antiquity, beginning with Tacitus, who was the first Roman author to mention them in his Germania, provide very little information on the Aesti. Although Tacitus never travelled to Magna Germania himself and only recorded information he had obtained from others, the short ethnographic excursus below is the most detailed ancient account of the Aesti that we have:

"Upon the right of the Suevian Sea the Aestian nations reside, who use the same customs and attire with the Suevians; their language more resembles that of Britain. They worship the Mother of the Gods. As the characteristic of their national superstition, they wear the images of wild boars. This alone serves them for arms, this is the safeguard of all, and by this every worshipper of the Goddess is secured even amidst his foes. Rare amongst them is the use of weapons of iron, but frequent that of clubs. In producing of grain and the other fruits of the earth, they labour with more assiduity and patience than is suitable to the usual laziness of Germans. Nay, they even search the deep, and of all the rest are the only people who gather amber. They call it glesum, and find it amongst the shallows and upon the very shore. But, according to the ordinary incuriosity and ignorance of Barbarians, they have neither learnt, nor do they inquire, what is its nature, or from what cause it is produced. In truth it lay long neglected amongst the other gross discharges of the sea; till from our luxury, it gained a name and value. To themselves it is of no use: they gather it rough, they expose it in pieces coarse and unpolished, and for it receive a price with wonder.

(Germania, chapter XLV).

The placement of the Tacitean Aesti is based primarily on their association with amber, a popular luxury item during the life of Tacitus, with known sources at the southeastern coast of the Baltic Sea. The Baltic amber trade, which appears to have extended to the Mediterranean Sea, has been traced by archaeologists back to the Nordic Bronze Age; its major center was in the region of Sambia.

This trade probably existed before the historical Trojan War in the 13th century BCE, as amber is one of the substances in which the palace of Menelaus at Sparta was said to be rich in Homer's Iliad.

=== Cassiodorus ===
Cassiodorus' Variae, published in 537, contains a letter written by Cassiodorus in the name of Theodoric the Great, addressed to the Aesti:

It is gratifying to us to know that you have heard of our fame, and have sent ambassadors who have passed through so many strange nations to seek our friendship.
We have received the amber which you have sent us. You say that you gather this lightest of all substances from the shores of ocean, but how it comes thither you know not. But as an author named Cornelius (Tacitus) informs us, it is gathered in the innermost islands of the ocean, being formed originally of the juice of a tree (whence its name succinum), and gradually hardened by the heat of the sun. Thus it becomes an exuded metal, a transparent softness, sometimes blushing with the color of saffron, sometimes glowing with flame-like clearness. Then, gliding down to the margin of sea, and further purified by the rolling of the tides, it is at length transported to your shores to be cast upon them. We have thought it better to point this out to you, lest you should imagine that your supposed secrets have escaped our knowledge. We sent you some presents by our ambassadors, and shall be glad to receive further visits from you by the road which you have thus opened up, and to show you future favors.

The style of the letter proves that the nation was at that time independent, not ruled by the Ostrogoths. Apparently, Cassiodorus considered it politically essential to establish friendly relations with the Nordic region. The letter also implies that the Aesti were fully confident of the value of amber and had made out of it a trade secret. Sending presents and promising to show future favors were in ancient times a cordial way of giving de jure recognition to another power.

=== Jordanes ===
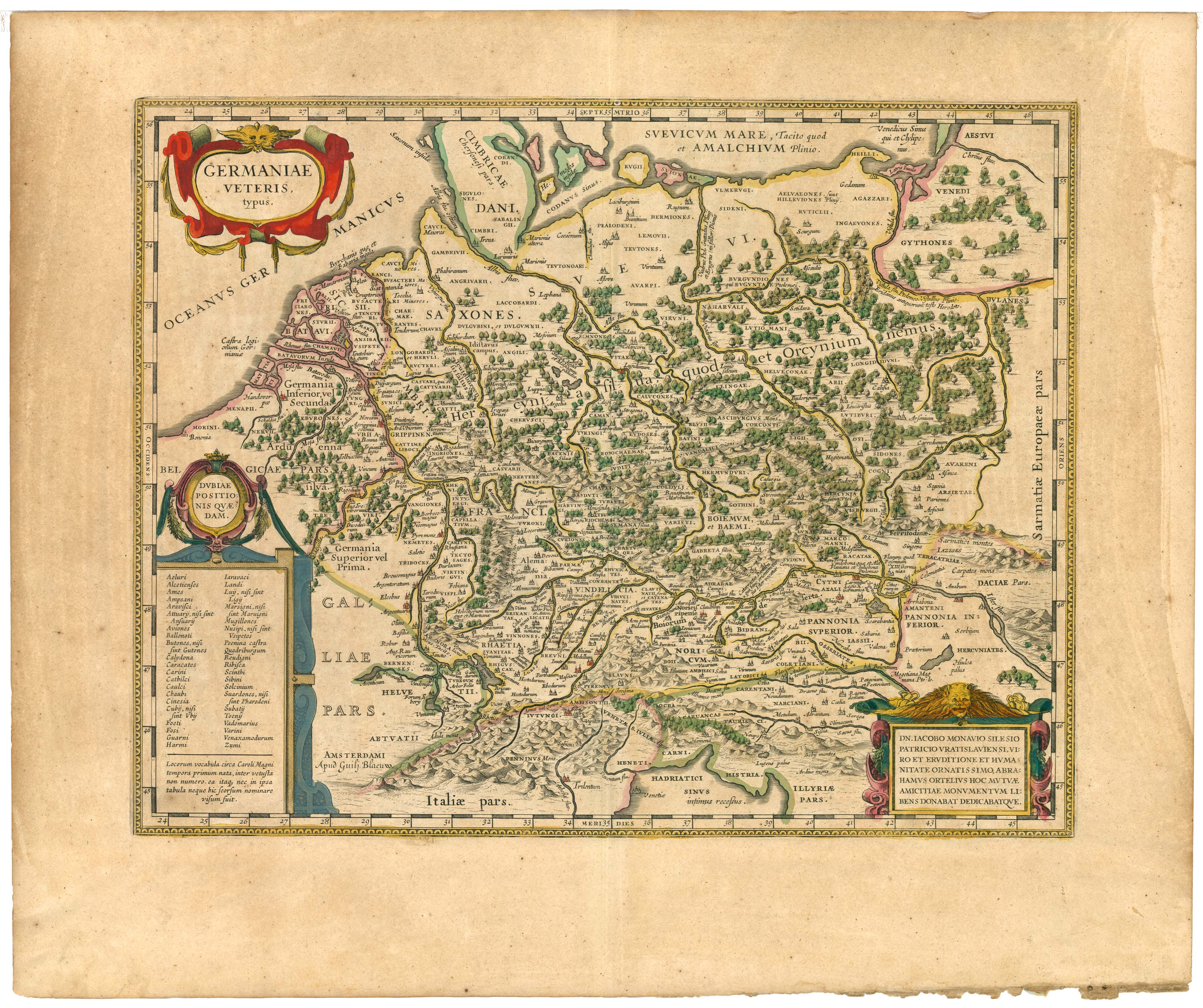
Willem and Joan Blaeu's 1645 work Germaniae veteris typus ("Historical map of Germany"). The "Aestui" are on the right upper corner of the map, north east of their likely homeland.

The sixth-century historian Jordanes makes two references to the Aesti in his book, "The Origins and the Deeds of the Goths", which was partly a treatment of Cassiodorus' longer book (which no longer survives) on the history of the Goths. The first quote geographically places the Aestii beyond the Vidivarii, on the shore of the Baltic: "a subject race, likewise hold the shore of Ocean." The next quote concerns the subjugation of the Aesti by Hermanaric, king of the Gothic Greuthungi: "This ruler also subdued by his wisdom and might the race of the Aesti, who dwell on the farthest shore of the German Ocean".

=== Alfred the Great ===
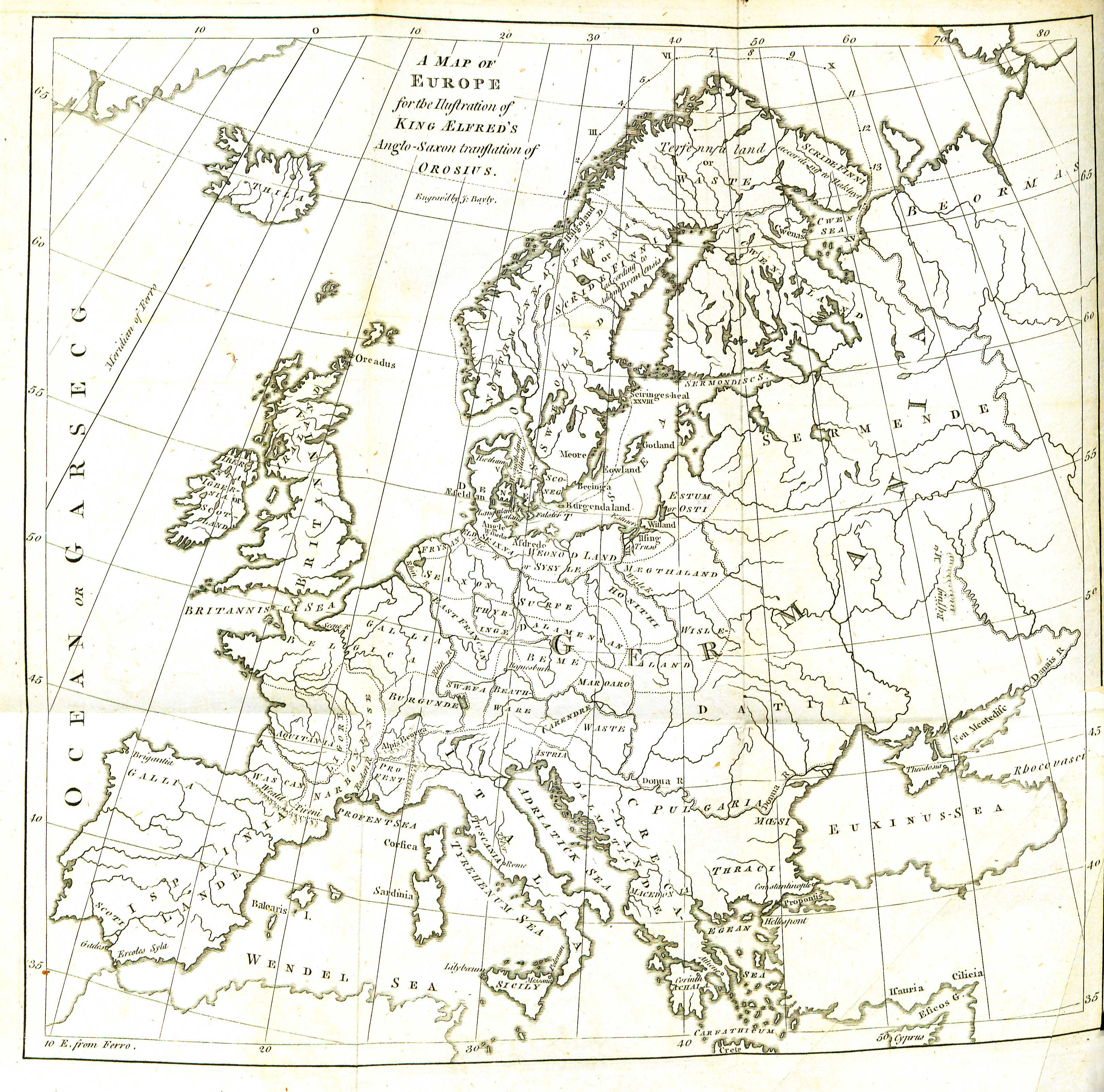
A Map of Europe for the Illustration of King Alfred's Anglo-Saxon translation of Orosius. Engraved by J. Bayly. 1773

In an 11th-century manuscript of King Alfred's account of the voyage from Hedeby to Truso by Wulfstan, held by the British Museum, includes ethnographic information on the medieval Aesti, in which the terms Esti, Est-mere and Eastland are used referring to Old Prussians. In the text, a summary description of the country and its riches is followed by a very detailed account of the people's funeral customs. It mentions the old trading port Truso of Old Prussians and also calls the land Witland - "the Vistula is a very large river, and near it lie Witland and Weonodland; and Witland belongs to the Esthonians ["belimpedh to Estum"]."

=== Adam of Bremen ===
During the 11th century, Adam of Bremen, citing Einhard (who in the Vita Caroli Magni states that "the Slavs and the Aisti live on the shores of the Eastern Sea"), mentions the coastal tribe as the Haisti, and refers to today's Estonia as Aestland.

== See also ==
- Aestian Island

== Notes, citations and references ==
=== Cited sources ===
- Deutschler, Yorck: "Die Aestii - Bezeichnung für die heutigen Esten Estlands oder die untergegangenen Pruzzen Ostpreußens" , in: Deutschler, Yorck, "Die Singende Revolution" - Chronik der Estnischen Freiheitsbewegung (1987–1991), pp. 196–198. Ingelheim, March 1998/June 2000. ISBN 3-88758-077-X
- Saks, Edgar Valter (1960). Aestii, An Analysis of an Ancient European Civilization. Studies in the Ur-European History". Part 1. Montreal–Heidelberg: Võitleja. link
