= Dzierzgoń (river) =

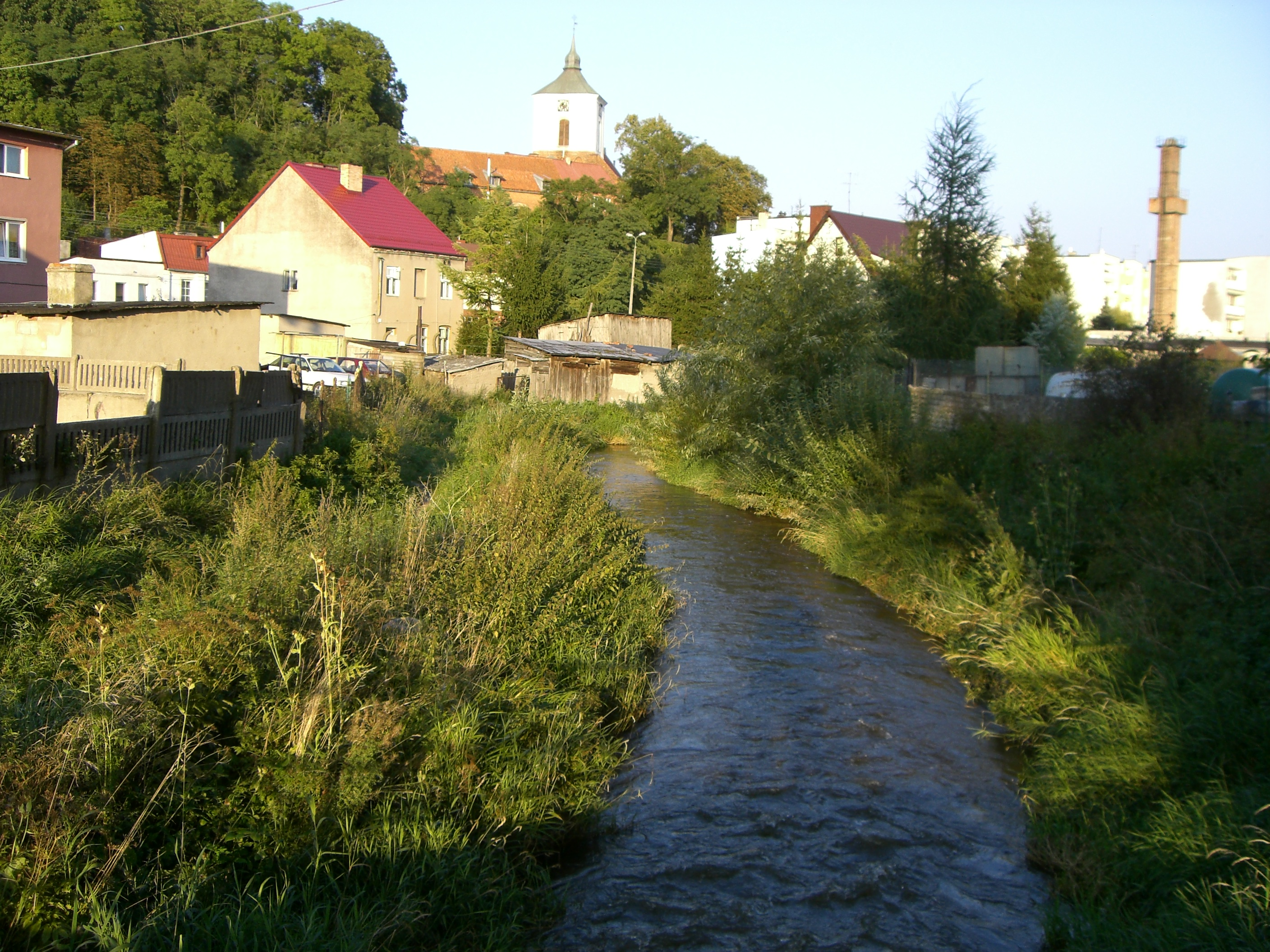
- Dzierzgoń River in the town of Dzierzgoń

- Location of the mouth in Poland

Location
- Country: Poland

Physical characteristics
- Mouth
  - location: Drużno
  - coordinates: 54°02′52″N 19°27′14″E

Basin features
- Progression: Elbląg→ Baltic Sea

The Dzierzgoń (Polish pronunciation: [ˈd͡ʑɛʒɡɔɲ]; German: Sorge) is a river in northern Poland.

It starts west of Morąg in the Warmian-Masurian Voivodeship and empties into Lake Drużno, which is drained by the river Elbląg river, south of the city of Elbląg.

The town of Dzierzgoń lies on the river.
