= Galtgarben Hill =

Hill on the Sambia Peninsula in Kaliningrad, Russia

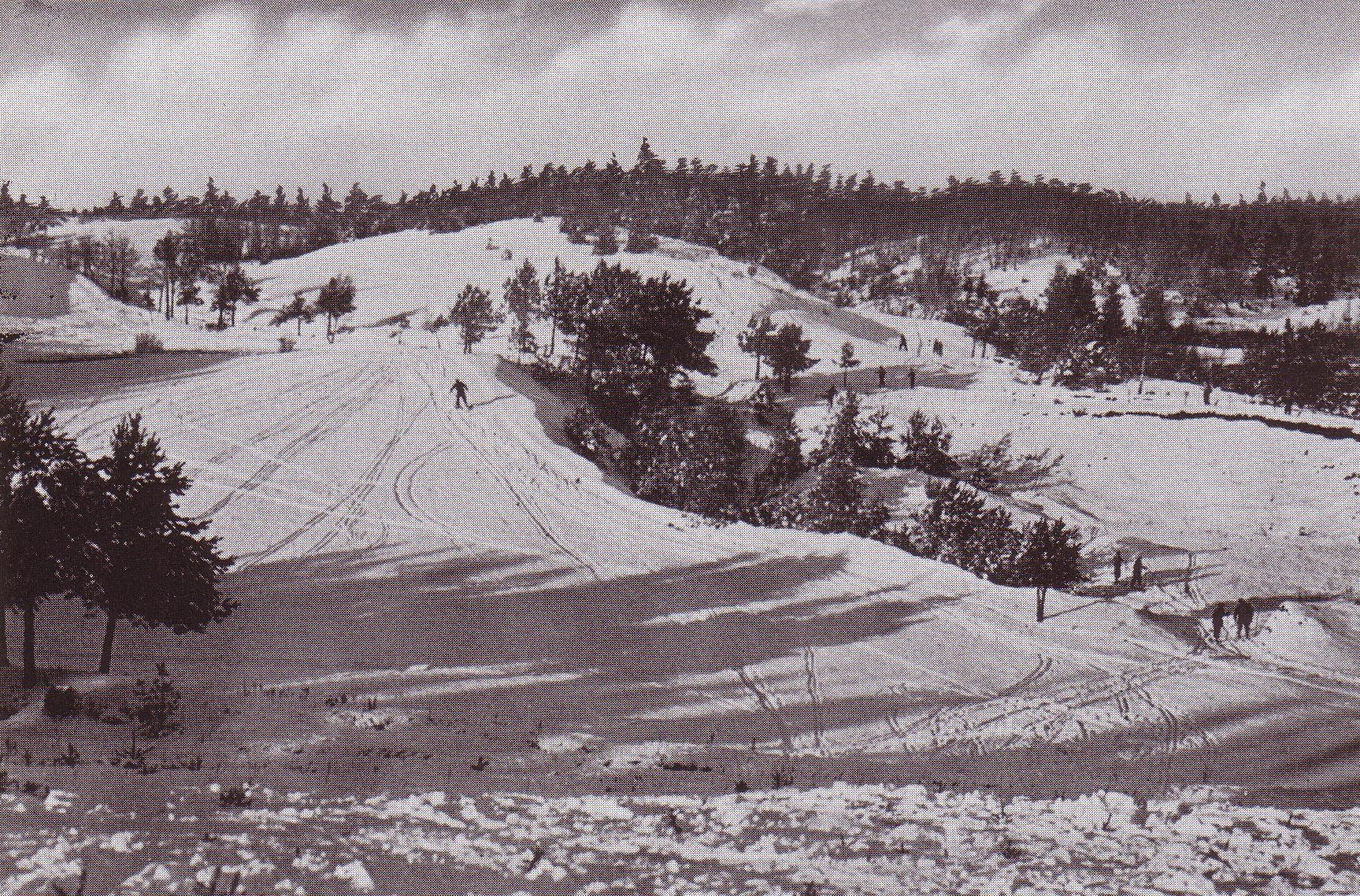
- Galtgarben Hill in the winter of 1928

Highest point
- Elevation: 110.4 m (362 ft)
- Coordinates: 54°48′15″N 20°14′00″E.

Geography
- Location: Sambia Peninsula, Kaliningrad oblast, Russia

Galtgarben Hill (in World War II documents known as Bismarck's Peak, its height is 111.4 m (365 ft), German: Galtgarben) is a mountain located on the territory of the Sambia Peninsula of the Kaliningrad oblast of Russia. Its height of 110.4 meters above sea level is the highest point of the peninsula. Until March 1, 1945, the top of the mountain was crowned by the Bismarck Tower, built through the efforts of the Pan-German League and opened on September 23, 1906, which in February 1945 was used as an observation post by General Beloborodov, commander of the 43rd Army of the Red Army.

== Description ==
Galtgarben Hill is located in the central part of the Sambia Peninsula, 20 km from Kaliningrad, not far from the highway to the western part of the peninsula and the Baltic Sea coast. Surrounded on three sides by forested hills, it is invisible to the surrounding area, and only the western woodless part makes it visible.

Before the military operations began in February 1945, there were many small settlements here. But during the fighting in February, March and April 1945, most of them were completely or partially destroyed and became the landmarks of numerous war graves. All of this gradually disappeared from the face of the earth, then -during the prolonged fighting and in peacetime- as a result of economic activity and reburial work.

On the plaques of the memorial complexes on the mass graves of Soviet soldiers in the settlements of Cherepanovo, Russkoe, Romanovo and Pereslavskoe are inscribed the surnames of the victims of the victorious side. There are more than 10 thousand people, according to the archival data.

== History ==
=== Prussian and German background ===
Galtgarben Hill has long attracted the attention of locals and aliens alike. Various buildings have been erected on it. Legends have been told about it, but it has always been a vantage point. According to some sources, the Galtgarben Hill was "one of the largest Prussian fortresses with an area of 170x50 meters. The ancient fortification is surrounded by two or three 4-6 meter high ramparts, overgrown with moss and trees, and deep ditches. To the west, at the foot of the Galtgarben, there was a fortified settlement". There is also a theory that the wooden Prussian fortress on Galtgarben may have been one of the main pagan sanctuaries of the Prussians in the 16th-18th centuries. During the Soviet times and up until 1945, the mountain was used as a mini ski resort during the winter months.

=== The Second World War ===
On the night of 1 March 1945, a large German unit secretly entered the top of the mountain. Fearing that the tower and the mountain would be occupied by the enemy, the tower was blown up and the top of the mountain was shelled with Katyusha rockets.

"My VP was at an altitude of 111.4. Actually, it's not an altitude, it's a height. But here, in the flat lowlands of Zemland, it really seemed like a mountain. The locals called it Bismarck's Peak. A stone pyramid was built on its top. Climbing up the steep steps to the platform of the pyramid, I involuntarily remembered how Bismarck in his time warned his countrymen about the futility and danger of a military conflict with Russia". Beloborodov A. P., "Always in the fight"

At the end of January 1945, the Soviet troops broke through the line Königsberg-Kranz. The enemy resistance was broken. Galtgarben Hill (or Bismarck's Peak, altitude 111.4) and the village of Kumachyovo were taken in passing. Sweeping away the scattered Volkssturm detachments, the Soviet troops marched southwest, cutting off Königsberg from the Zemland grouping of German troops, to Fischhausen Bay and the sea, to the naval fortress of Pillau. On January 31, 1945, the 87th Guards Division reached the bay in Gross Heidekrug. And on February 3, 1945, soldiers of the 91st Guards Rifle Division of the 39th Army took Germau. But enemy resistance was growing. The Germans transferred combat units from other parts of the front to the peninsula by sea. Heavy and bloody battles were fought in the area of Germau. On February 9, the enemy captured Germau. The front line approached Galtgarben and the village of Kumenen.

"Height 111.4 was now 3-4 kilometers from the front line. The entire woodless plain was dominated by the stone pyramid. On the right it was cut by the gray ribbon of the Königsberg highway. There, above the cluster of red brick houses of Kumenen, stood the Gothic spire of the Kirkha. And directly to the west the snow fields were smoking with the bursts of hundreds of shells and mines". Beloborodov A.P., "Always in the fight"

The weather was frosty. Heavy tanks moved freely on the frozen ground. The Germans persistently tried to break through to the besieged Königsberg via Kumenin, bypassing the forest near Pobetino and directly through the Galtgarben Hill. The approaches to Galtgarben were defended by the 87th Guards Rifle Division, and to Kumenin by the 263rd Rifle Division.

"The main combat load in the February battles fell on the personnel of the 87th Guards Division of General Kirill Yakovlevich Tymchik and the 263rd Sivash Division of Colonel Cornelius Georgievich Cherepanov. Both of them firmly led units and subdivisions, quickly and decisively eliminated individual breakthroughs of enemy tanks and infantry". Beloborodov A.P., "Always in the fight"

The battle situation in this direction stabilized after the unsuccessful German attempt to take Galtgarben on the night of March 1, 1945. Under the cover of Galtgarben Hill and the surrounding forests, the Soviet troops prepared for the attack on Kyiv from the northwest. On April 6, 1945 the positions of the units of the 43rd and 39th Armies in the area of the hill were handed over to the units of the 5th Army. After the capture of Königsberg on April 9, 1945, the fighting on the western approaches to Galtgarben Hill resumed with renewed vigor. The liquidation of the German Zemland grouping was underway.

=== Post War Period ===
In the late 1940s and into the early 1950s, the summit and slopes of Galtgarben were a wasteland torn apart by grenade explosions. All buildings on and near the mountain were razed to the ground. A prison camp was located northwest of the mountain in the former settlements of Nastrenen and Dallvenen. A dirt road ran along the northern slope of the mountain from the camp to the highway to Kaliningrad. From the northeastern slope of the mountain, through the forest, on the abandoned road it was possible to pass to Voroshilovo settlement (now a part of Pereslavskoe settlement). In 1946 settlers from Yaroslavl region came here. They called the Galtgarben — "hill".

In 1985, a memorial complex and a mass grave of Soviet soldiers were opened in the village of Pereslavskoye. In addition to the soldiers buried here in 1945, the remains of soldiers from the military cemeteries of the Kumachevo settlement and other areas of the Galtgarben Hill were transferred here. The greatest losses here were suffered by the 87th Guards, 263rd, 182nd, 144th Rifle Divisions, penal military units of the 43rd and 5th Armies and the 10th Infantry Division. The memorial plaques of the complex bear 5165 names of fallen soldiers.

== Bibliography ==
- Кучерявый П. П., Фёдоров Г. М. География Калининградской области. — Калининград: Калининградское книжное издательство, 1989. P. 33 — 35.
- Белобородов А. П. «Всегда в бою». От Тильзита до горы Бисмарка
- Исаак Кобылянский. «Прямой наводкой по врагу». Бой на высоте 111.4
- Василевский А. М. «Дело всей жизни». Весной 45-го в Восточной Пруссии
