= Mokhovoye, Kaliningrad Oblast =

Rural locality in Zelenogradsky District, Kaliningrad Oblast, Russia

Coordinates: 54°56′N 20°29′E

Mokhovoye (Russian: Мохово́е; German: Wiskiauten; Lithuanian: Viskiautai) is a rural locality (a settlement) in Zelenogradsky District of Kaliningrad Oblast, Russia, less than 4 km from Zelenogradsk and from the southwestern corner of the Curonian Lagoon. About 320 people live there.

Kaup is the name of a hill immediately north, where a large burial site with Scandinavian grave goods was found. It was important in early medieval history as a likely starting point of the Amber Road to the south.
