= Wulfstan of Hedeby =

Late ninth century traveller and trader

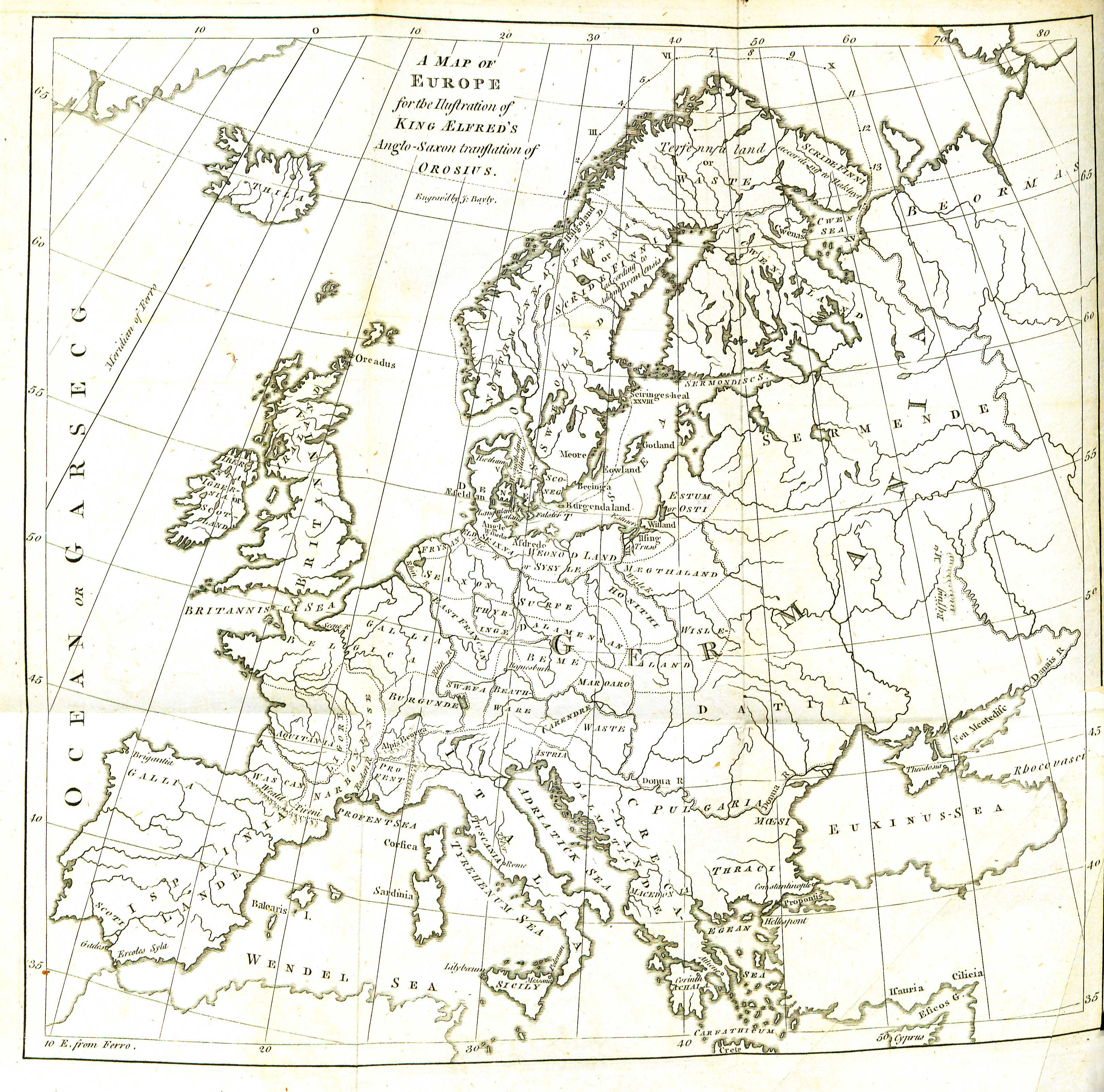
A Map of Europe for the Illustration of King Alfred's Anglo-Saxon translation of Orosius. Engraved by J. Bayly.1773.

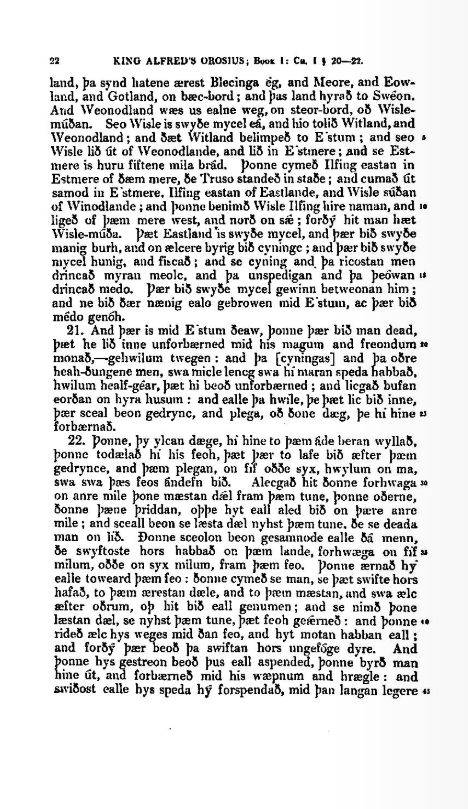
Text of Wulfstan, where Old Prussians are mentioned. 1859 edition.

Wulfstan of Hedeby was a late ninth-century traveller and trader. His travel accounts, as well as those of another trader, Ohthere of Hålogaland, were included in the Old English Orosius. It is unclear if Wulfstan was English or indeed if he was from Hedeby, in what is now northern Germany near the city of Schleswig but in the 9th century was Danish.

According to this account, Wulfstan undertook a journey by sea from Hedeby to the Prussian trading centre of Truso around the year 880. He names the lands the coasts he passes.

Wulfstan said that he went from Haethum to Truso in seven days and nights, and that the ship was running under sail all the way. Weonodland was on his right, and Langland, Laeland, Falster, and Sconey, on his left, all which land is subject to Denmark. Then on our left we had the land of the Burgundians, who have a king to themselves. Then, after the land of the Burgundians, we had on our left the lands that have been called from the earliest times Blekingey, and Meore, and Eowland, and Gotland, all which territory is subject to the Sweons; and Weonodland (the land of the Wends) was all the way on our right, as far as Weissel-mouth.

This may be the earliest recorded use of the word "Denmark" (Danemearcan). The text of Wulfstan is also one of the earliest attestments of unique traditions and customs of Western Balts – Prussians, called Aesti, and their land called Witland in his text. The purpose of this travel remains unclear; one hypothesis is that King Alfred was interested in having allies against Vikings and therefore looked at Prussians (Aesti) as a potential ally.

== Bibliography ==
- Orosius, Paulus, King of England, Alfred, translator Bosworth, J. and editor Hampson, R.T. (1859). King Alfred's Anglo-Saxon version of the Compendious history of the world by Orosius. Containing,--facsimile specimens of the Lauderdale and Cotton mss., a preface describing these mss., etc., an introduction—on Orosius and his work; the Anglo-Saxon text; notes and various readings; a literal English translation, with notes; Mr. Hampson's Essay on King Alfred's geography, and a map of Europe, Asia, and Africa, according to Orosius and Alfred.[online] archive.org. Available at: https://archive.org/stream/kingalfredsangl00boswgoog#page/n0/mode/2up [Accessed 20 May 2018].
- The catalog of Paulus Orosius History of the World - 1859 edition. [online] catalog.hathitrust.org. Available at: https://catalog.hathitrust.org/Record/000114863 [Accessed 20 May 2018].
- Appleton, Helen (2025), 'Ohthere and Wulfstan: A Short Introduction', ROEP: Resources for Old English Prose, University of Oxford
- Jesch, J. (2018). Who was Wulfstan?. [online] prusaspira.org. Available at: http://www.prusaspira.org/pogezana/Jesch.pdf [Accessed 20 May 2018].
- Englert, A. and Trakadas, A. (2009). Wulfstan's Voyage: The Baltic Sea Region in the early Viking Age as seen from shipboard (Maritime Culture of the North). Roskilde: The Viking Ship Museum. ISBN 978-8785180568
- Kemp Malone, On King Alfred's Geographical Treatise, Speculum, Vol. 8, No. 1. (Jan., 1933), pp. 67–78
- Samuel H. Cross, Notes on King Alfred's North: Osti, Este, Speculum, Vol. 6, No. 2. (Apr., 1931), pp. 296–299
