= Elbląg (river) =

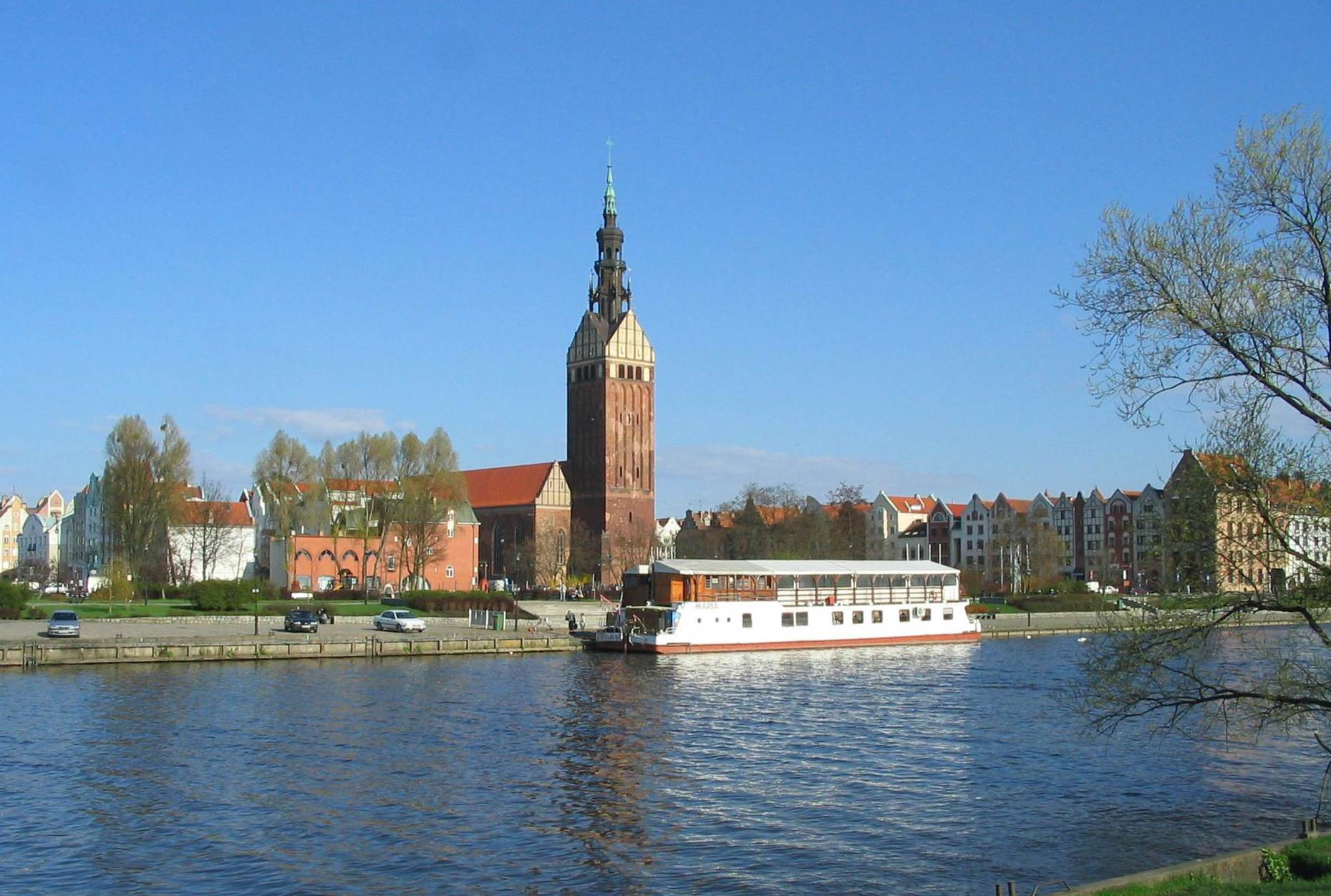
- Elbląg River in the city of Elbląg

- Location of the mouth in Poland

Location
- Country: Poland
- Voivodeship: Warmian-Masurian

Physical characteristics
- Source
  - location: Lake Drużno
  - coordinates: 54°06′45″N 19°26′04″E
- Mouth
  - location: Vistula Lagoon
  - coordinates: 54°15′09″N 19°22′55″E
- Length: 14.5 km (9.0 mi)
- Basin size: 1,499.9 km^{2} (579.1 sq mi)

The Elbląg (German: Elbing) is a 14.5-kilometre (9.0 mi) river in northern Poland connecting Lake Drużno with the Vistula Lagoon. The eponymous city of Elbląg is situated on the river. The tributaries of the Elbląg include the Fiszewka, Kumiela and Tina.

The oldest known mention of the river in the form Ilfing comes from the report of sailor Wulfstan from the end of the 9th century. The report was included in The Voyages of Ohthere and Wulfstan which was written in Anglo-Saxon in King Alfred's reign.

== Etymology ==
Latest research suggest Scandinavian origin of the name. According to Elbląg museum the elusive Truso settlement was founded and inhabited mostly by Scandinavians. The recent research shows that the name Ilfing was Anglo-Saxon form of a Scandinavian name, which could be reconstructed as Old-Nordic Elfeng, Elfangr or Elfing from Old-Nordic elf-r - meaning "river", and Old-Nordic eng, enge, engi meaning "meadow". The 16th century German pastor, historian and cartographer Caspar Henneberger, wrote in his book Erklärung der preußischen größeren Landtafeln oder Mappen ("explanation of the larger Prussian maps"):

"Anno 1237. Zog. Herman Balck Landmeister/mit den zwey Schiffen/so ihm der Marggraff Heinrich aus Meissen/hat machen lassen/auf ein Werder in Pogezanien/bey dem Haff gelegen/mit dem Fluss Elbing beflossen/darauff bawet er eine Burg/und hies sie nach dem Fluss Elbing/oder von Oelfang/Eelfang".

The theory of the Old Germanic origin of the name Elbing river has been also strongly supported by prominent Polish linguist Jan Michał Rozwadowski. Thus the meaning of the river's name would be "River flowing through boggy meadows".
