= Truso =

Early Medieval trading center at the southern Baltic Sea coast

- Location within Poland Location within Warmian-Masurian Voivodeship
- 54.066667°N 19.45°E
- Cultures: Baltic, Slavic, Gothic, Scandinavian
- Location: Northern Poland
- Region: Vistula Lagoon, Pomesania

History
- Abandoned: 10th-century

Site notes
- Area: around 20 ha
- Excavation dates: 1897, 1945, 1980
- Archaeologists: Marek F. Jagodziński
- Website: Muzeum Archeologiczno-Historyczne

Truso was a Viking Age port of trade (emporium) set up by the Scandinavians at the banks of the Nogat delta branch of the Vistula River, close to a bay (the modern Drużno lake), where it emptied into the shallow and brackish Vistula Lagoon. This sizeable lagoon is separated from the Gdańsk Bay by the Vistula Spit at the southern Baltic Sea coast. In the 9th century, the merchant Wulfstan of Hedeby travelled to Truso in the service of the English King Alfred the Great and wrote his account of the place at a prominent location of the Amber Road, which attracted merchants from central and southern Europe, who supplied the markets in the Mediterranean and the Middle East with the highly valued commodity.

The account of the voyage to the town of Truso in the land of the Pruzzens around the year 890 by Wulfstan of Hedeby has been included in Alfred the Great's translation of Orosius' Histories. Moreover, Wulfstan named Truso as being near Estmere (which is his rendition of the Old Prussian Aīstinmari and Lithuanian Aistmarės for Vistula Lagoon). In the words of Marija Gimbutas, "the name of the town is the earliest known historically in the Baltic Sea area".

== History ==
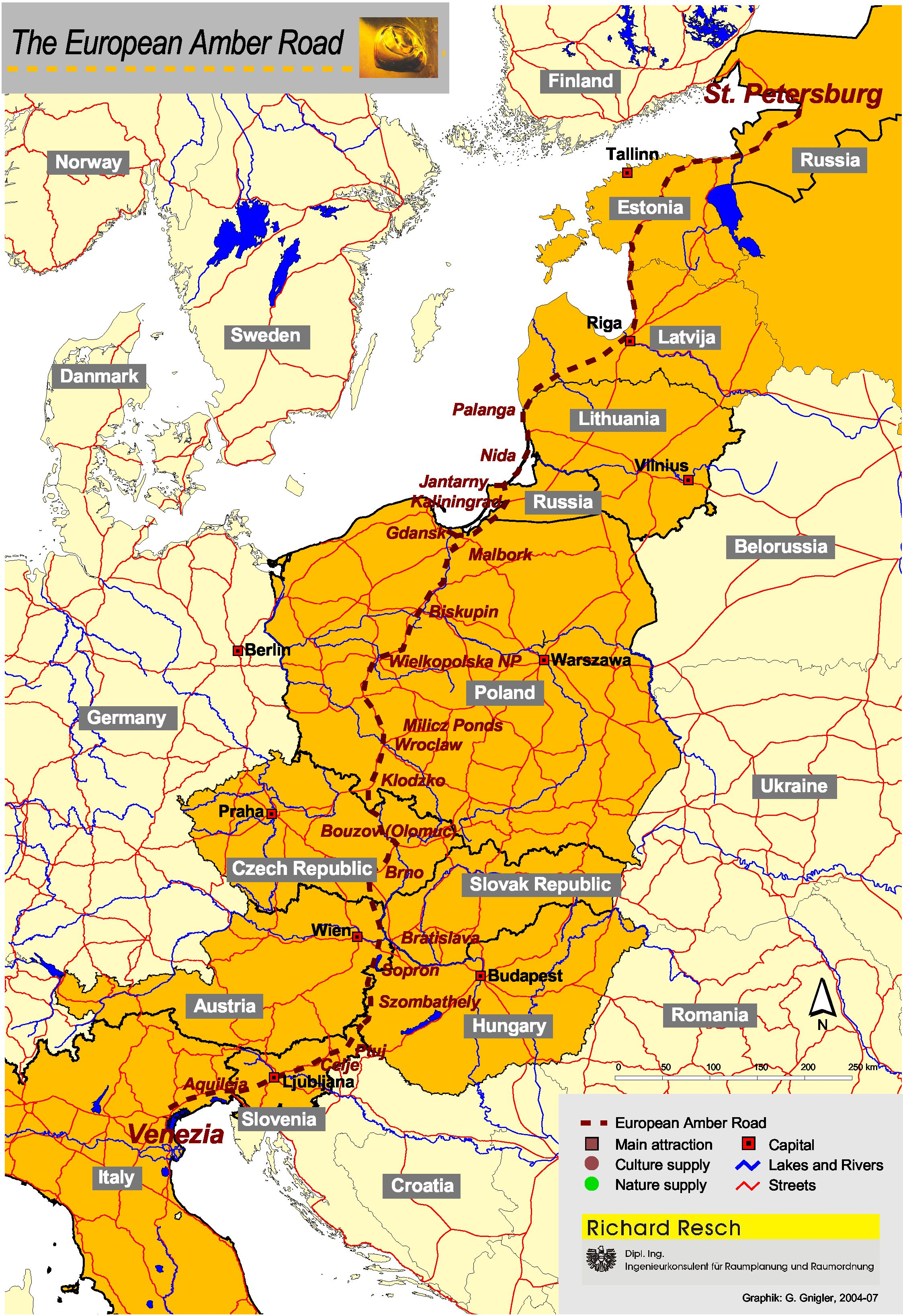
The Amber Road (eastern route), as hypothesized by Polish historian Jerzy Wielowiejski, Główny szlak bursztynowy w czasach Cesarstwa Rzymskiego (Main Route of the Amber Road of the Roman Empire), 1980

Truso was situated in a central location upon the Eastern European trade routes, which led from Birka in Sweden via Visby on the island of Gotland towards the southern Baltic Sea shore, where in the 13th century the Hanseatic city of Elbing was established. From there, trade continued further south along the Amber Road to Carnuntum in the Alps. These ancient roads led further south-west and south-east to the Black Sea and eventually to North Africa and the Middle East. Gimbutas has observed that

For Old Prussia, Truso played the same central role as Haithabu for north-western Germany or the Slavic Vineta for Pomerania.

East–western trade routes lead from Truso and Wiskiauten (a rival trading centre in Old Prussia, at the south-western corner of the Courish Lagoon), along the Baltic Sea to Jutland and from there up the Slien inlet to Haithabu (Hedeby), the large trading center in Jutland. This town, located close to the modern city of Schleswig in Schleswig-Holstein, was centrally located and could be reached from all four directions over land as well as from the North Sea and the Baltic Sea.

Around the year 890, Wulfstan of Hedeby embarked on his seven-day journey from Hedeby to Truso at the behest of king Alfred the Great. He named the lands and the coasts he had passed as the ship was travelling under sail all the way. Weonodland was on his right and Langland, Laeland, Falster and Sconey on his left, all land that is subject to Denmark.

Wulfstan resumes:

Then on our left we had the land of the Burgundians, who have a king to themselves. Then, after the land of the Burgundians, we had on our left the lands that have been called from the earliest times Blekingey, and Meore, and Eowland, and Gotland, all which territory is subject to the Sweons; and Weonodland (the land of the Wends) was all the way on our right, as far as the Vistula estuary.

The most sought after commodities of Truso were amber, animal furs and (pagan) slaves, while the industries of blacksmithing and amber working provided processed trading goods. The beginnings of the town has been dated back to approximately the end of the 7th century, while in the second half of the 10th century siltation in the Nogat had begun to cut off the town from the Vistula lagoon and the Baltic Sea. The town's importance as trading port began to decline and was eventually eclipsed by the ascent of Gdańsk as the local trading center, that was situated right by the sea.

Historians still debate the motive for this expedition. King Alfred obviously needed allies in his defense against the Danish and Norwegian Vikings, who had already taken over most of England. However, that reason for the journey is rather unlikely, since Truso was at the time little more than a trading center and Alfred the Great, the West Saxon ruler, already kept in close contact with the continental Saxons and the Franks.

== Archaeology ==
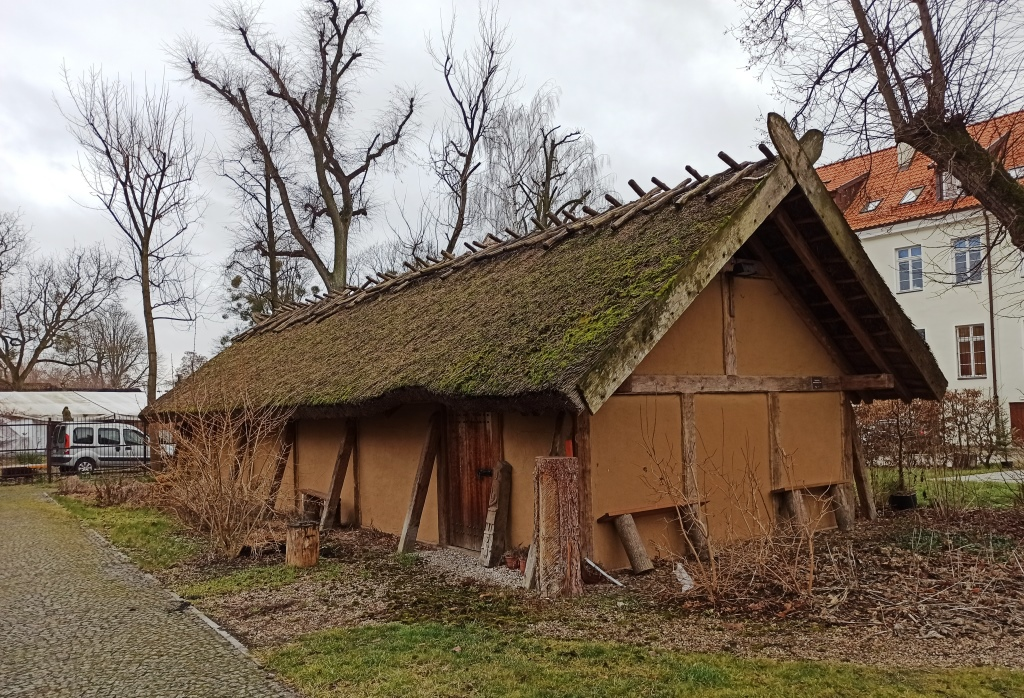
Reconstruction of a Truso house in the Elbląg Museum of Archaeology and History

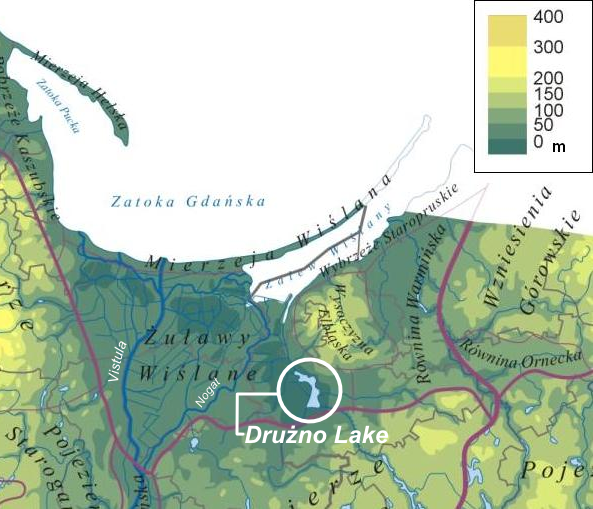
Location of Druzno Lake

First attempts at finding the exact location of the town date back to the early sixteenth century. Based on Prussian archaeological finds from 1897 and excavations which began in the 1920s, archaeologists located Truso near Elbing (since 1945 Janów Pomorski near Elbląg). Found artifacts, dating from the 7th to 12th century, were stored in the Elbing Museum, now the Elbląg Museum. In the 1980s, the Polish archaeologist Marek Jagodziński had resumed excavations and cleared a site of circa 20 hectare, in which a series of structures had burnt down around the year 1,000.

Trade must have been of great importance at the settlements, as the numerous merchant graves along the river testify. Artefacts unearthed at the site include scales, weights, silver horseshoe brooches, belt buckles, swords, coins, elaborate jewelry imported from Scandinavia, garment accessories and armament components. Scandinavian traders and craftmen lived and worked in central and port area, while peripheral area might be inhabited also by Balts and Slavs. The Scandinavian influence on these settlements and artefacts is particularly obvious and confirms Viking expansion of settlement activity to Courland and Livland. As early as the 8th century, the first incursions of North Germanic groups took place, which lead to the founding of the Grobin/Seeburg settlement near Liepája. Archbishop Rimbert of Bremen recorded the immigration of a group under the Svea king Olaf during the 9th century.

Author Gwyn Jones noted that at the circa 20 ha sized area "no true town has been found and excavated" and that the identification of the site in Elbląg with Truso is based on "finds of Norse weapons" and the presence of "a large Viking Age cemetery" nearby, According to Mateusz Bogucki "by now, there is no doubt that the settlement really is Wulfstan's Truso" The Elbląg Museum brochure: Truso- A Discovered Legend, by Marek F. Jagodziński, describes a large number of buildings found during the recent excavations, with burnt remains of posts suggesting buildings of around 5 by 10 metres (16 by 33 ft) and long houses of about 6 by 21 metres (20 by 69 ft). A thick layer of ash, debris and numerous arrowheads suggest that the city was destroyed by pirates or invaders.

Mateusz Bogucki of the Polish Academy of Sciences at the Institute of Archaeology and Ethnology, states in his book

Coin finds in the viking Age emporium at Janów Pomorski (Truso) and the Prussian phenomenon about ...the end of Truso as a port of trade...a strong political power, probably of Piast origin...sent warriors to try to take control...and destroyed the town.
