= Dzierzgoń =

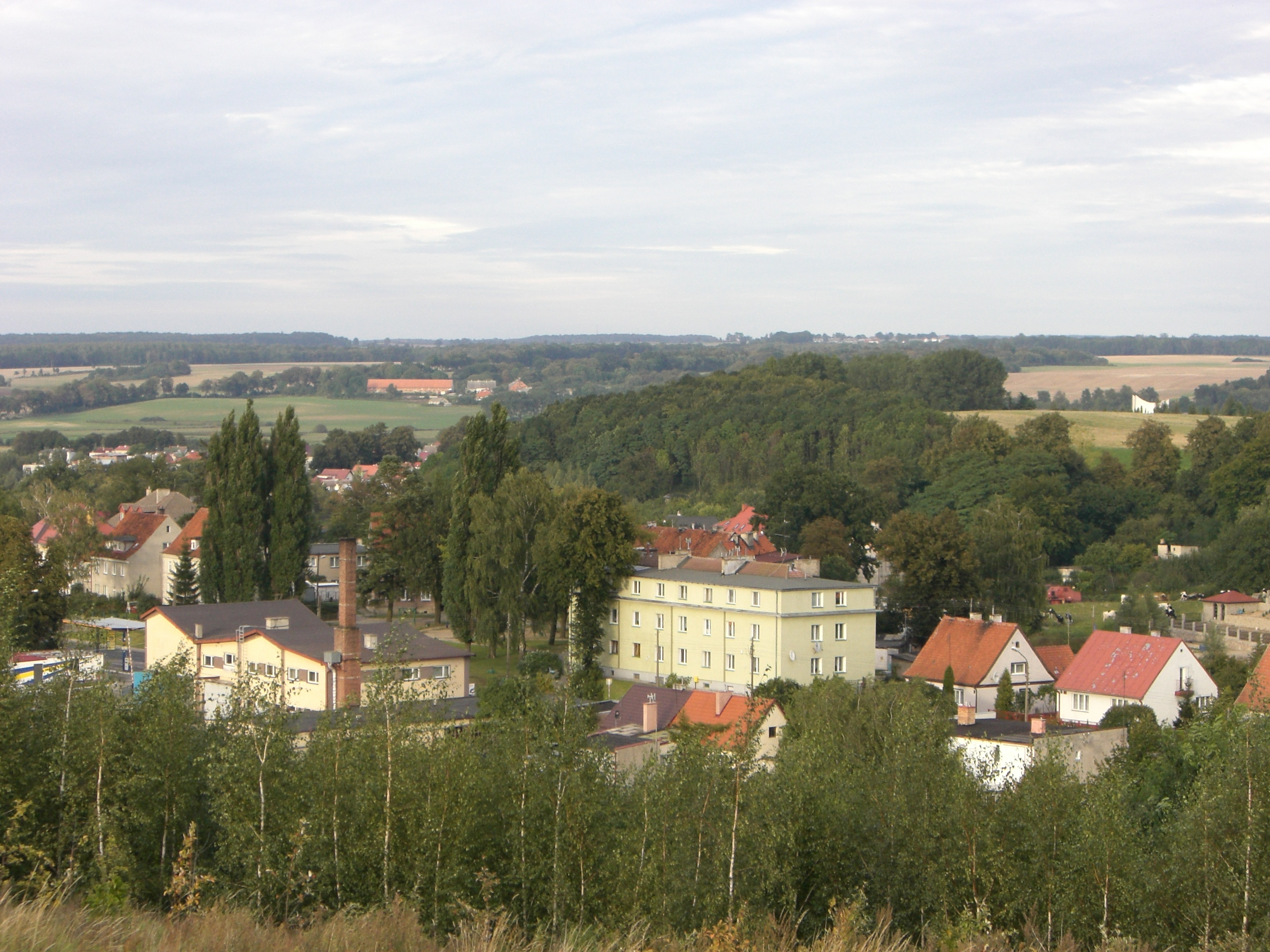
- View of Dzierzgoń

- Coat of arms

- Location within Poland
- Coordinates: 53°55′24″N 19°21′5″E
- Country: Poland
- Voivodeship: Pomeranian
- County: Sztum
- Gmina: Dzierzgoń

Area
  - Total: 3.88 km^{2} (1.50 sq mi)

Population (31 December 2021)
  - Total: 5,242
  - Density: 1,350/km^{2} (3,500/sq mi)
- Time zone: UTC+1 (CET)
  - Summer (DST): UTC+2 (CEST)
- Postal code: 82-440
- Area code: +48 55
- Car plates: GSZ
- Website: http://www.dzierzgon.pl/

Dzierzgoń [ˈd͡ʑɛʐɡɔɲ] (formerly also: Kiszpork; German: Christburg) is a town in the Pomeranian Voivodeship in northern Poland. It is located in Sztum County east of Malbork and south of Elbląg on the river Dzierzgoń. Dzierzgoń has a population of 5,242, while the town and its environs have a combined population of about 10,000.

== History ==
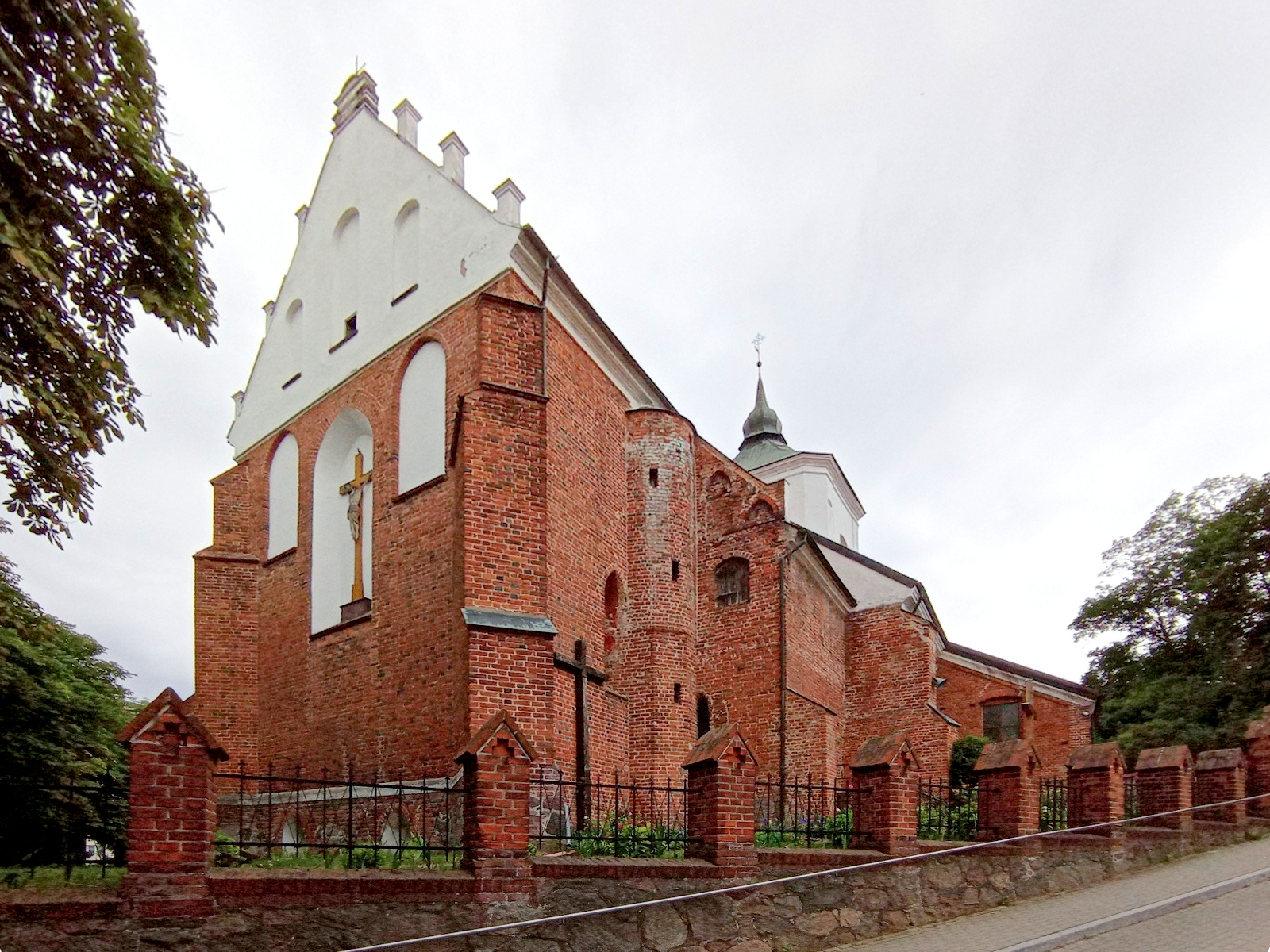
Gothic Holy Trinity and Saint Catherine church

The town was originally a settlement of Old Prussian tribe of Pomesanians. Settlement dates back to the Early Middle Ages. The oldest name is Sirgune, from which the historic Polish name Dzierzgoń comes from.

In 1247, a castle known as Neu Christburg (German for "New Castle of Christ") was founded overlooking the Dzierzgoń river, a few kilometers away from an older fortress known as Alt Christburg (Stary Dzierzgoń) by Teutonic Knights brought to Poland by Konrad I of Masovia. In 1249 a peace treaty was signed at the new castle between the victorious Teutonic Order and defeated local Old Prussians, in presence of papal legate, future Pope Urban IV. In 1254, the town which had developed near the castle was first referred to as Christburg (in Polish known as Kiszpork). Within the Monastic State of the Teutonic Order, Christburg was an administrative seat for the regional Komtur. Both Polish and German settlement began around 1280. By 1288 the settlement was granted town rights.

Following the victorious Battle of Grunwald, in 1410, Polish King Władysław II Jagiełło stayed in the castle, after it was abandoned by the Teutonic Knights. In the castle, the king received delegations from the city of Elbląg, which then pledged allegiance to him and recognized his authority. In 1411, the Poles left the castle, and the Teutonic Knights retook it. The castle was captured by Poles again in 1414.

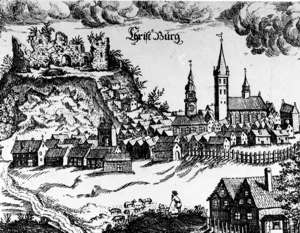
Kiszpork (Dzierzgoń) in 1684, by Christoph Hartknoch

In 1454, upon the request of the anti-Teutonic Prussian Confederation, the town was incorporated into the Kingdom of Poland by King Casimir IV Jagiellon, and the castle was handed over to Poland. The town sided with Poland in the subsequent Thirteen Years' War, after which in the 1466 peace treaty the Teutonic Knights renounced any claims to the town. It was officially named Dzierzgoń in the documents, and administratively it was located in the Malbork Voivodeship in the Polish province of Royal Prussia in the Greater Poland Province. The castle became the seat of local starosts (local administrators). From 1508 the town was renamed to Kiszpork. Guilds developed under Polish rule, and trade flourished in the town. Local starosts granted privileges to the guilds of shoemakers, bakers, tailors, butchers, and wheelwrights. In 1622, the Polish Sejm merged the functions of the Kiszpork/Dzierzgoń starost and the Malbork voivode. Sejmiks (local parliaments) of the local nobility were held in the castle. A battle between Poland and Sweden was fought in Kiszpork in 1627, during the Polish–Swedish War (1626–1629). In 1647 a privilege was granted, allowing the trade in wine. In 1720, a mission house was established by Jesuits from nearby Braniewo.

In 1772 it was annexed by the Kingdom of Prussia during the First Partition of Poland and was incorporated into the new province of West Prussia. During the Napoleonic Wars, the town was captured by France in 1807. In October–December 1831, various interned Polish cavalry and infantry units and honor guards of the November Uprising stopped in the town on the way to their internment places. Christburg became part of the German Empire upon its foundation in 1871 during the unification of Germany. Around 1900 Christburg had two Catholic churches, a Protestant church, a synagogue, a county court, a brewery and a dairy. Until 1919 Christburg belonged to the administrative district of Regierungsbezirk Marienwerder in the German Province of West Prussia.

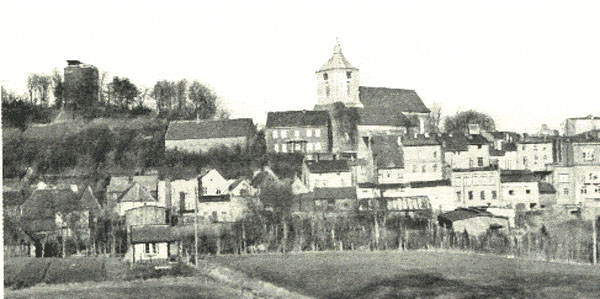
Pre-WWII panorama

In 1920, after World War I and the reestablishment of independent Poland, a plebiscite was held to determine whether the region would be part of Germany or Poland. In the town 2,571 inhabitants voted to remain in Weimar German East Prussia, 13 votes supported Poland, thus the town remained part of Germany. Over the time span 1919–39 Christburg belonged to the administrative district of Regierungsbezirk Westpreußen in the Province of East Prussia, and from 26 October 1939 until 1945 to Regierungsbezirk Marienwerder in the new province of Reichsgau Danzig-West Prussia.

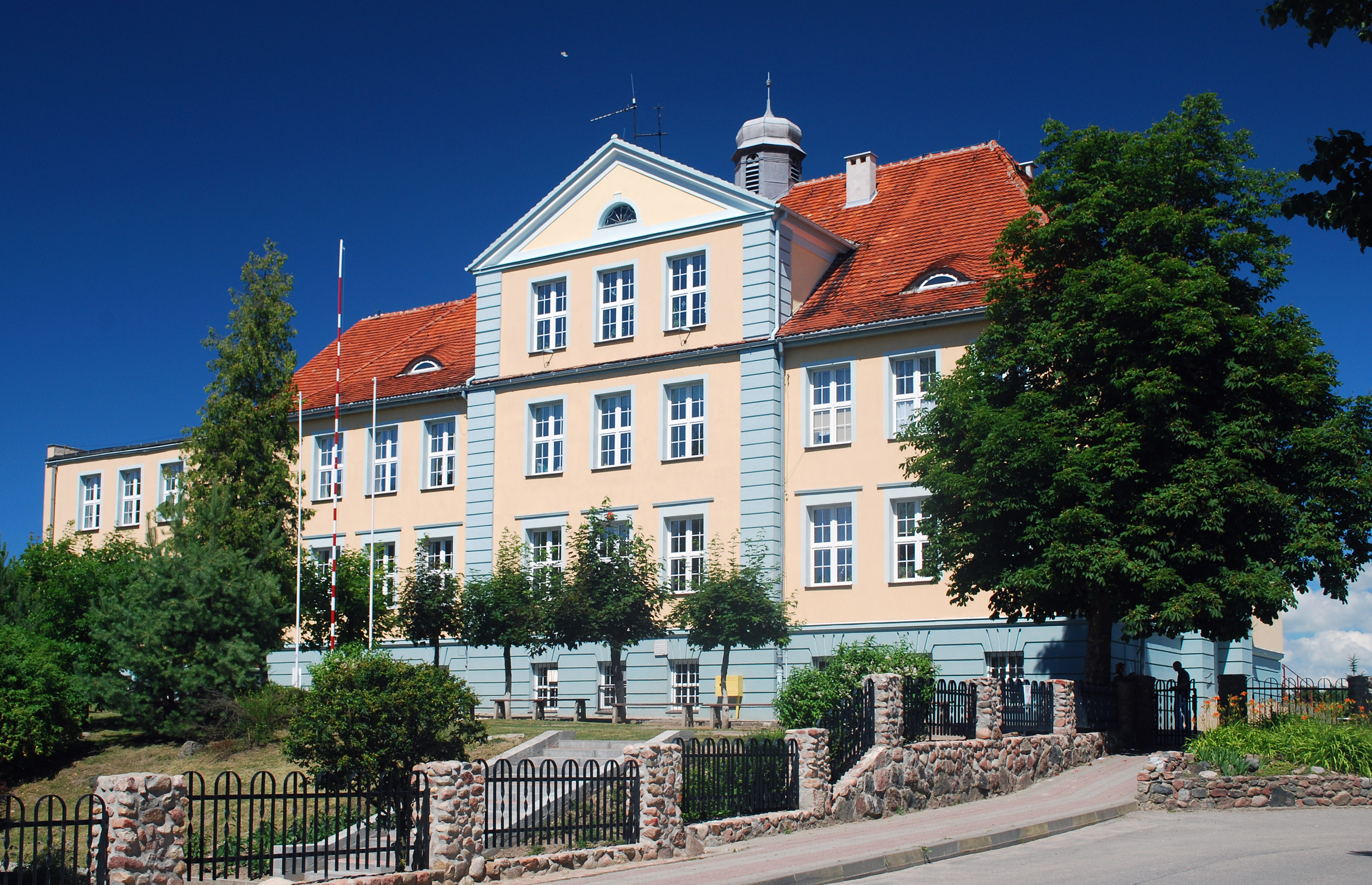
Primary school

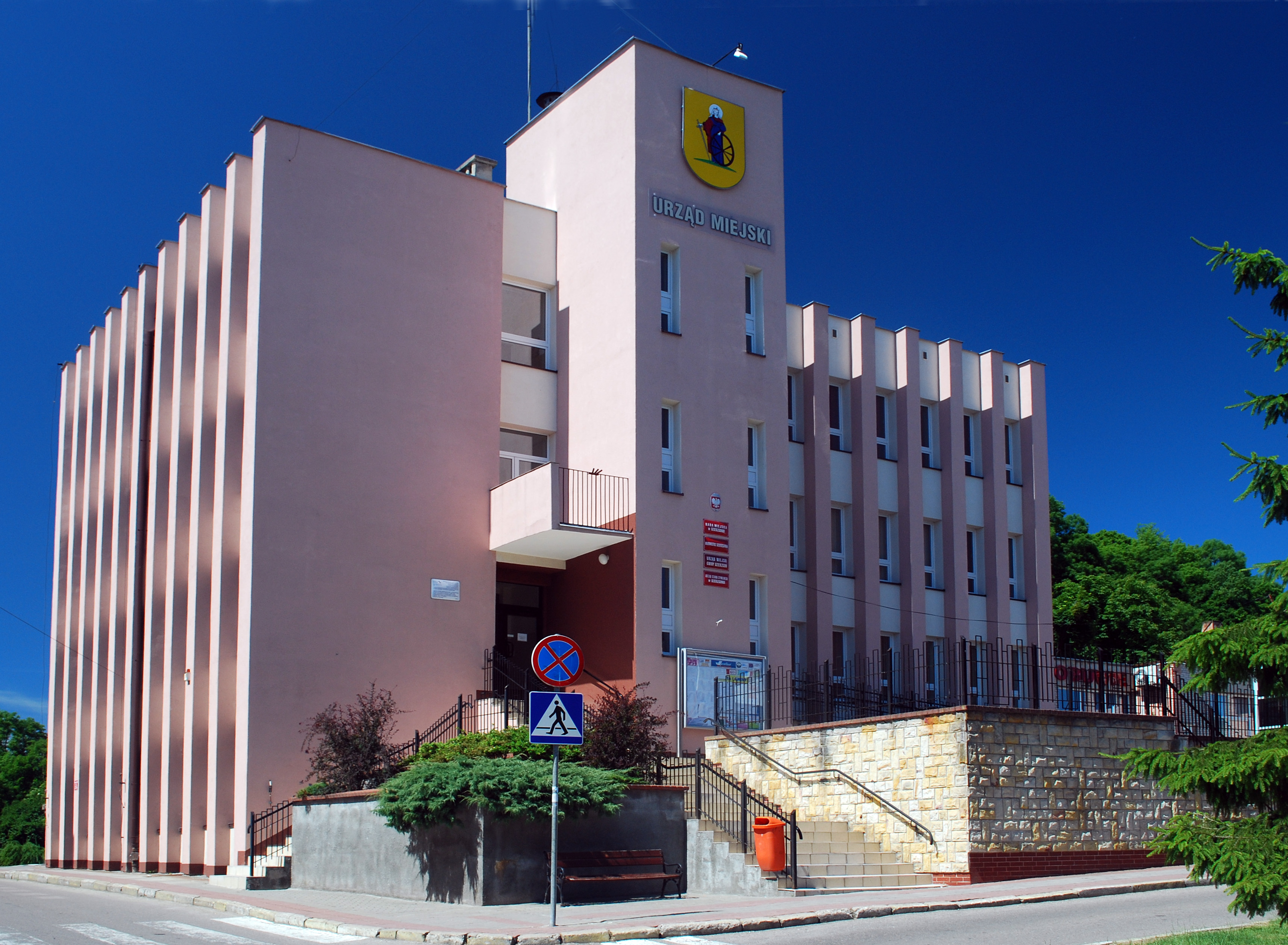
Town hall

During World War II, within today's town limits, the Germans established and operated a forced labour subcamp of the German military prison in Grudziądz in German-occupied Poland. In the final stages of the war the town's populace was evacuated by the Germans on January 21–22, and on January 24, 1945 the German administration left the town, which then fell to the Soviets. The first local Polish official was appointed in April 1945. Several months later the town was handed over to Poland, and the name Dzierzgoń, based on an Old Prussian Zirgūni name, was restored. At the turn of 1945 and 1946, the Polish resistance movement carried out successful attacks against communists and Soviets, acquiring weapons, uniforms and money. The town was resettled by Poles from Polish areas annexed by the Soviet Union and Ukrainians expelled from southeast Poland in 1947. The former Roman Catholic Cloister is now a Ukrainian Eastern Rite Catholic Church.

== Demographics ==
=== Number of inhabitants by year ===
Historical population

| Year | Pop. | ±% |
|---|---|---|
| 1789 | 1,505 | — |
| 1793 | 1,695 | +12.6% |
| 1831 | 2,183 | +28.8% |
| 1875 | 3,303 | +51.3% |
| 1880 | 3,284 | −0.6% |
| 1890 | 3,113 | −5.2% |

| Year | Pop. | ±% |
|---|---|---|
| 1895 | 3,218 | +3.4% |
| 1900 | 3,116 | −3.2% |
| 1925 | 2,920 | −6.3% |
| 1933 | 3,366 | +15.3% |
| 1939 | 3,603 | +7.0% |
| 2006 | 5,630 | +56.3% |

Note that the above table is based on primary, possibly biased sources:

== Sports ==
The local football team is Powiśle Dzierzgoń. It competes in the lower leagues.

== Notable residents ==
- Ernst Schirlitz (1893–1978) a German vice admiral in the navy
- Oberleutnant Franz Schleiff (1896-??) a World War I flying ace

== International relations ==
Dzierzgoń is twinned with:

| Finspång, Sweden; Finsterwalde, Germany | Nordborg, Denmark; Sittensen, Germany |
