= Mokhovoy =

Mokhovoy (Russian: Моховой; masculine), Mokhovaya (Моховая; feminine), or Mokhovoye (Моховое; neuter) is the name of several rural localities in Russia.

== Modern localities ==
=== Altai Krai ===
As of 2012, one rural locality in Altai Krai bears this name:

- Mokhovoye, Altai Krai, a selo in Novozorinsky Selsoviet of Pavlovsky District; 53°15′N 83°27′E

=== Kaliningrad Oblast ===
As of 2012, one rural locality in Kaliningrad Oblast bears this name:

- Mokhovoye, Kaliningrad Oblast, a settlement in Kovrovsky Rural Okrug of Zelenogradsky District

=== Kurgan Oblast ===
As of 2012, two rural localities in Kurgan Oblast bear this name:

- Mokhovoye, Makushinsky District, Kurgan Oblast, a selo in Mokhovskoy Selsoviet of Makushinsky District
- Mokhovoye, Shadrinsky District, Kurgan Oblast, a village in Kabansky Selsoviet of Shadrinsky District

=== Kursk Oblast ===
As of 2012, one rural locality in Kursk Oblast bears this name:

- Mokhovoye, Kursk Oblast, a village in Baninsky Selsoviet of Fatezhsky District

=== Moscow Oblast ===
As of 2012, one rural locality in Moscow Oblast bears this name:

- Mokhovoye, Moscow Oblast, a village under the administrative jurisdiction of Beloomut Work Settlement in Lukhovitsky District

=== Novosibirsk Oblast ===
As of 2012, two rural localities in Novosibirsk Oblast bear this name:

- Mokhovoye, Novosibirsk Oblast, a settlement under the administrative jurisdiction of Chany Work Settlement in Chanovsky District
- Mokhovaya, Novosibirsk Oblast, a village in Tatarsky District

=== Oryol Oblast ===
As of 2012, nine rural localities in Oryol Oblast bear this name:

- Mokhovoye, Belokolodezsky Selsoviet, Kolpnyansky District, Oryol Oblast, a village in Belokolodezsky Selsoviet of Kolpnyansky District
- Mokhovoye, Znamensky Selsoviet, Kolpnyansky District, Oryol Oblast, a selo in Znamensky Selsoviet of Kolpnyansky District
- Mokhovoye, Kromskoy District, Oryol Oblast, a village in Gostomlsky Selsoviet of Kromskoy District
- Mokhovoye, Novoderevenkovsky District, Oryol Oblast, a selo in Surovsky Selsoviet of Novoderevenkovsky District
- Mokhovoye, Ivanovsky Selsoviet, Pokrovsky District, Oryol Oblast, a settlement in Ivanovsky Selsoviet of Pokrovsky District
- Mokhovoye, Mokhovskoy Selsoviet, Pokrovsky District, Oryol Oblast, a selo in Mokhovskoy Selsoviet of Pokrovsky District
- Mokhovoye, Verkhovsky District, Oryol Oblast, a village in Galichinsky Selsoviet of Verkhovsky District
- Mokhovoye, Zalegoshchensky District, Oryol Oblast, a selo in Mokhovsky Selsoviet of Zalegoshchensky District
- Mokhovaya, Oryol Oblast, a village in Mokhovsky Selsoviet of Zalegoshchensky District

=== Perm Krai ===
As of 2012, five rural localities in Perm Krai bear this name:

- Mokhovoye, Beryozovsky District, Perm Krai, a village in Beryozovsky District
- Mokhovoye, Kungursky District, Perm Krai, a selo in Kungursky District
- Mokhovoye (Nasadskoye Rural Settlement), Kungursky District, Perm Krai, a village in Kungursky District; municipally, a part of Nasadskoye Rural Settlement of that district
- Mokhovoye (Zarubinskoye Rural Settlement), Kungursky District, Perm Krai, a village in Kungursky District; municipally, a part of Zarubinskoye Rural Settlement of that district
- Mokhovaya, Perm Krai, a village under the administrative jurisdiction of the town of krai significance of Chaykovsky

=== Ryazan Oblast ===
As of 2012, one rural locality in Ryazan Oblast bears this name:

- Mokhovoye, Ryazan Oblast, a selo in Mokhovskoy Rural Okrug of Skopinsky District

=== Samara Oblast ===
As of 2012, two rural localities in Samara Oblast bear this name:

- Mokhovoy, Kinelsky District, Samara Oblast, a settlement in Kinelsky District
- Mokhovoy, Koshkinsky District, Samara Oblast, a settlement in Koshkinsky District

=== Saratov Oblast ===
As of 2012, two rural localities in Saratov Oblast bear this name:

- Mokhovoy, Saratov Oblast, a khutor in Alexandrovo-Gaysky District
- Mokhovoye, Saratov Oblast, a selo in Yershovsky District

=== Sverdlovsk Oblast ===
As of 2012, one rural locality in Sverdlovsk Oblast bears this name:

- Mokhovoy, Sverdlovsk Oblast, a settlement under the administrative jurisdiction of the Town of Nizhnyaya Salda

=== Tambov Oblast ===
As of 2012, two rural localities in Tambov Oblast bear this name:

- Mokhovoye, Nikiforovsky District, Tambov Oblast, a village in Yurlovsky Selsoviet of Nikiforovsky District
- Mokhovoye, Pervomaysky District, Tambov Oblast, a settlement in Chernyshevsky Selsoviet of Pervomaysky District

=== Tula Oblast ===
As of 2012, four rural localities in Tula Oblast bear this name:

- Mokhovoye, Bogoroditsky District, Tula Oblast, a village in Tovarkovsky Rural Okrug of Bogoroditsky District
- Mokhovoye, Kireyevsky District, Tula Oblast, a village in Novoselsky Rural Okrug of Kireyevsky District
- Mokhovoye, Ivanovskaya Volost, Kurkinsky District, Tula Oblast, a village in Ivanovskaya Volost of Kurkinsky District
- Mokhovoye, Mokhovskaya Volost, Kurkinsky District, Tula Oblast, a village in Mokhovskaya Volost of Kurkinsky District

=== Ulyanovsk Oblast ===
As of 2012, one rural locality in Ulyanovsk Oblast bears this name:

- Mokhovoye, Ulyanovsk Oblast, a settlement in Orekhovsky Rural Okrug of Radishchevsky District

=== Voronezh Oblast ===
As of 2012, three rural localities in Voronezh Oblast bear this name:

- Mokhovoy, Voronezh Oblast, a khutor in Sinelipyagovskoye Rural Settlement of Nizhnedevitsky District
- Mokhovoye, Anninsky District, Voronezh Oblast, a selo in Novokurlakskoye Rural Settlement of Anninsky District
- Mokhovoye, Povorinsky District, Voronezh Oblast, a settlement in Samodurovskoye Rural Settlement of Povorinsky District

== Abolished localities ==
- Mokhovoye, Beryozovsky District, Perm Krai, a village in Beryozovsky District of Perm Krai; abolished in December 2011

== Alternative names ==
- Mokhovaya, alternative name of Mokhovskoye, a selo in Mokhovskoy Selsoviet of Aleysky District in Altai Krai; 52°38′N 82°29′E
- Mokhovaya, alternative name of Mokhovo, a selo in Mokhovskaya Rural Territory of Belovsky District in Kemerovo Oblast;

54°35′N 86°22′E
