= Prussia (region) =

Historical region on the south-eastern coast of the Baltic Sea in Europe

Prussia Prusy (Polish) Пруссия (Russian) Prūsija (Lithuanian) Preußen (German)
- Historical region
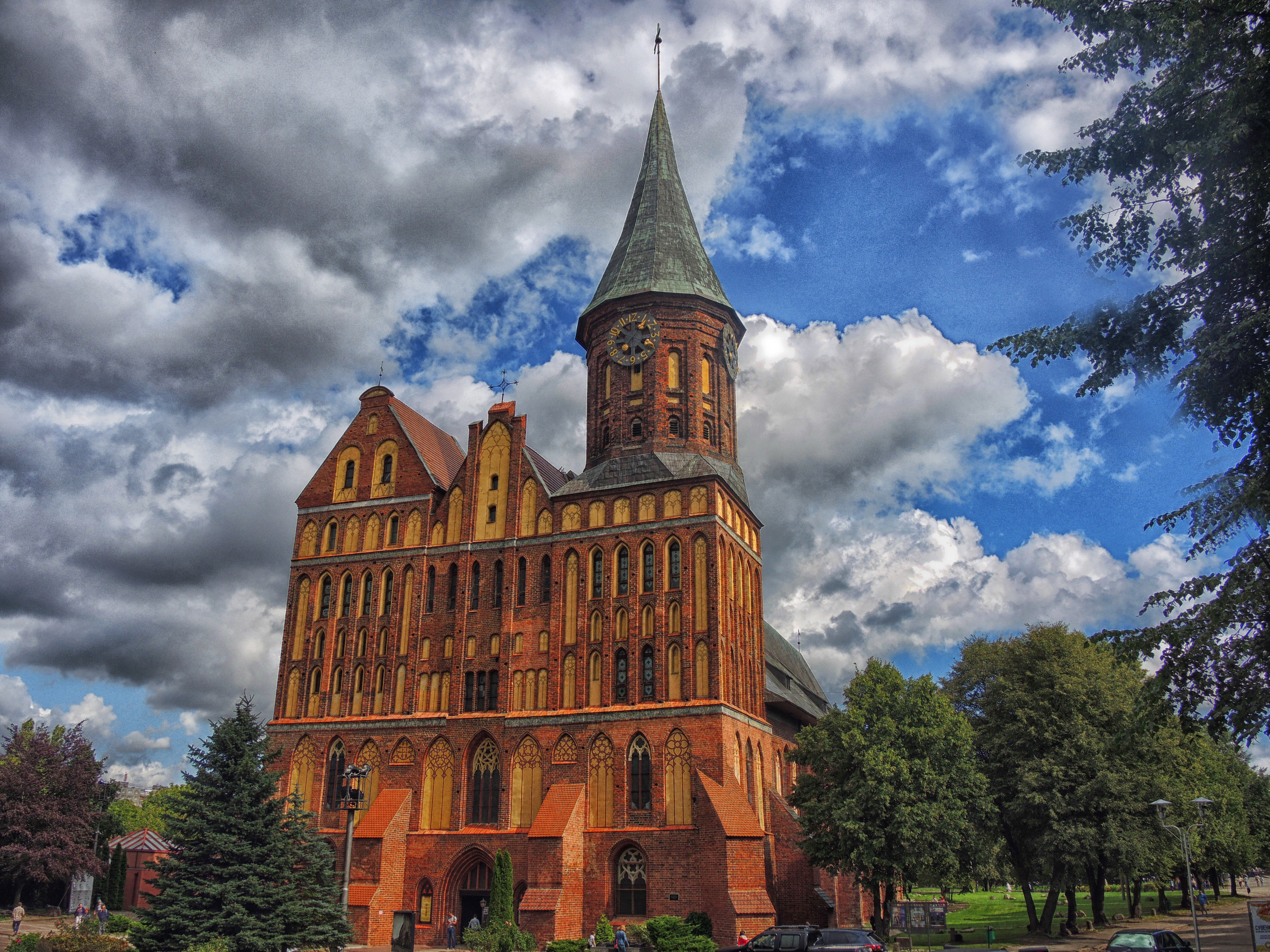
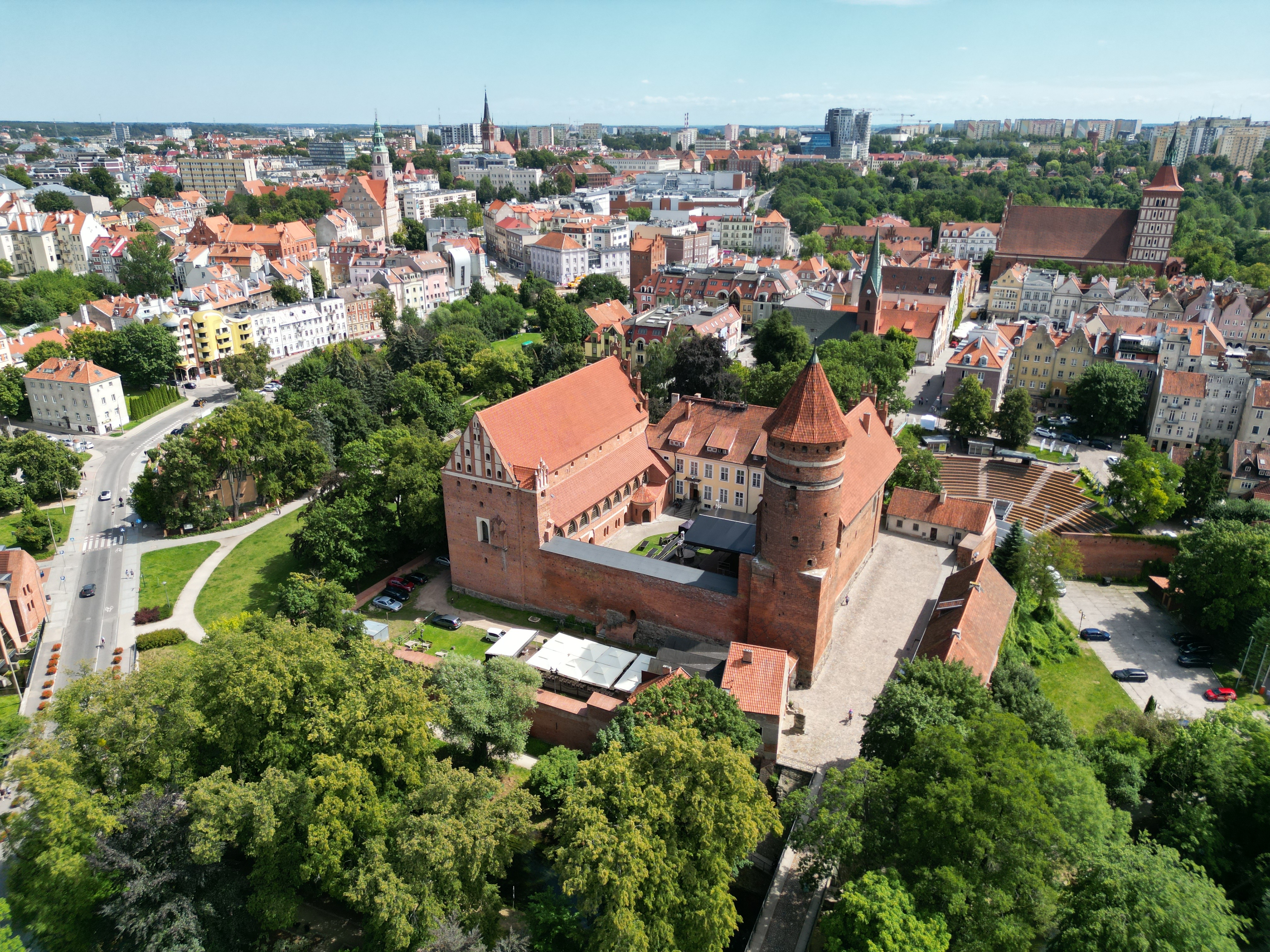
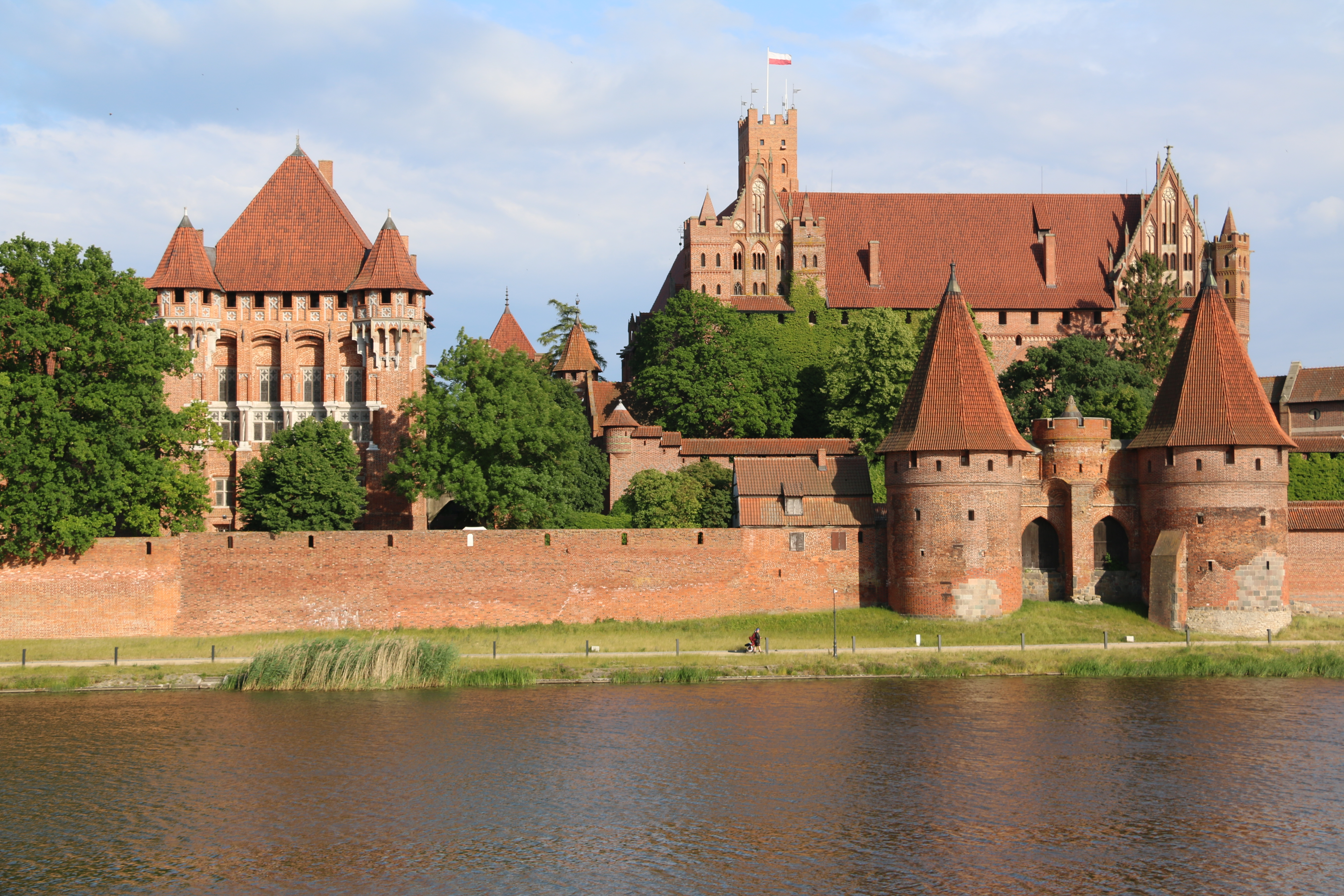
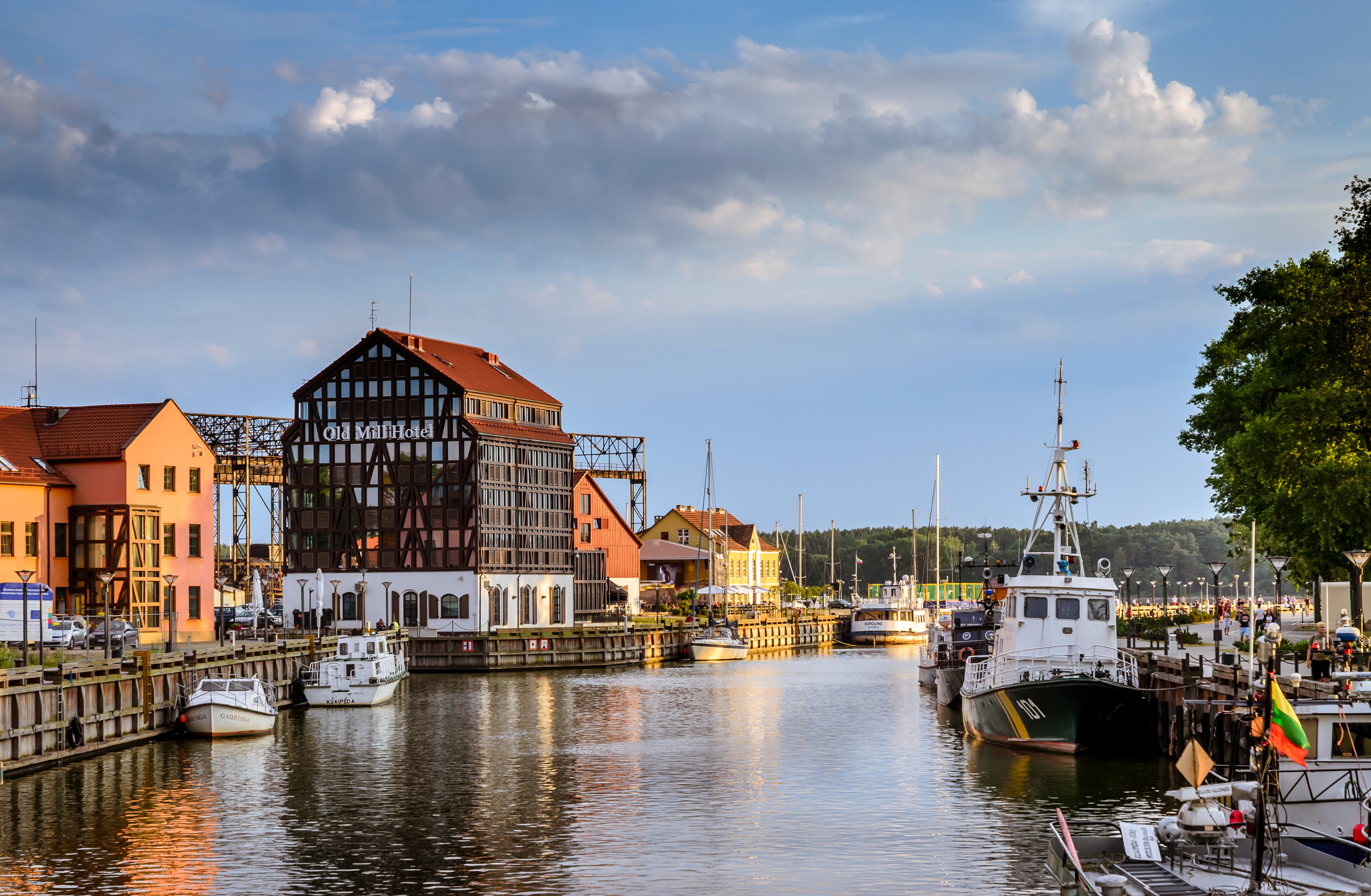
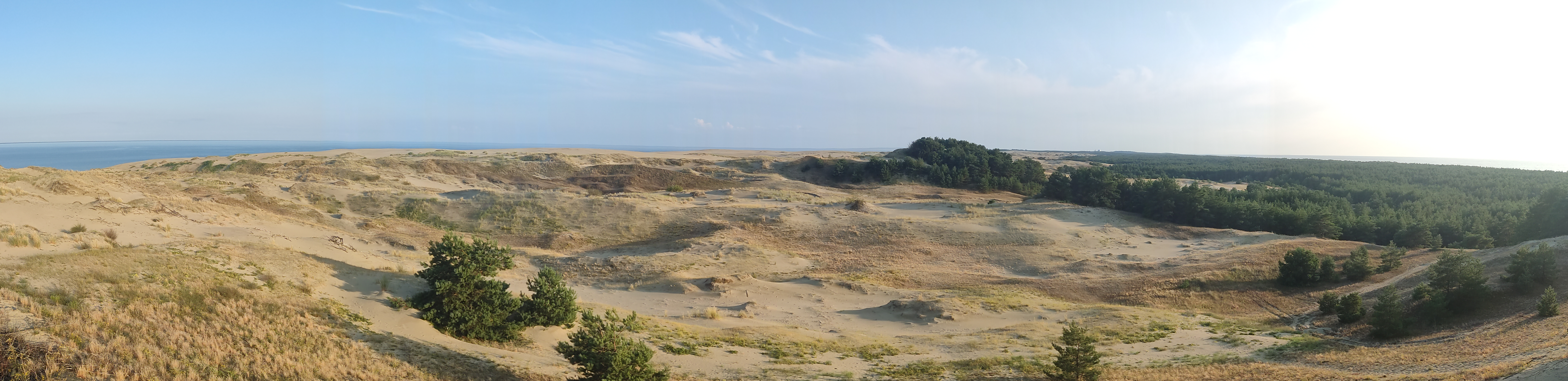
- Königsberg Cathedral Olsztyn Old Town Malbork Castle Port of Klaipėda Curonian Spit dunes

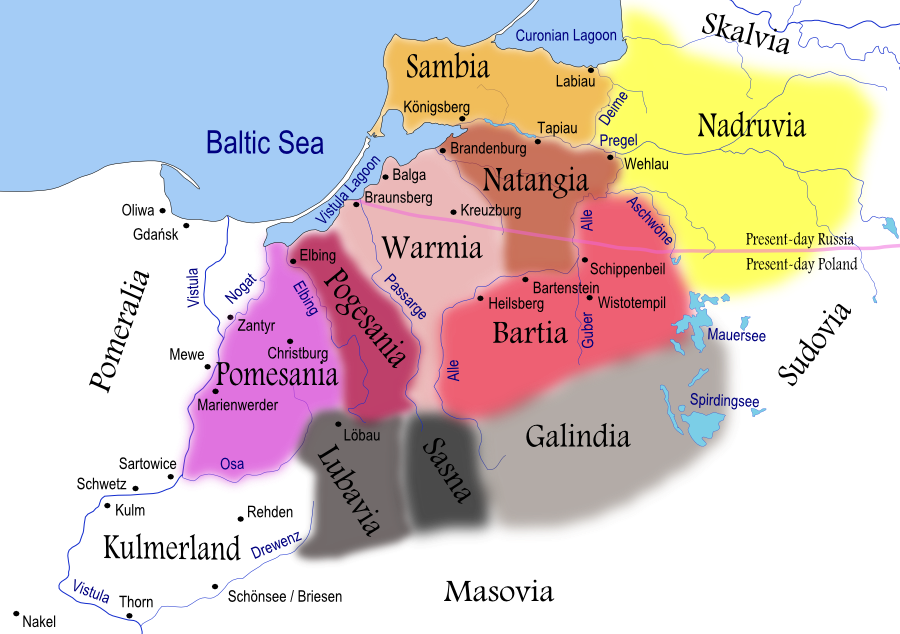
- Map of the indigenous Baltic tribes that inhabited the region of Prussia prior to the Prussian Crusade, around 1200 AD
- Country: Poland; Russia; Lithuania
- Largest city: Kaliningrad
- Primary airports: Khrabrovo Airport; Olsztyn-Mazury Airport

Prussia (Note: Polish: Prusy [ˈprusɨ]; Lithuanian: Prūsija; Russian: Пруссия [ˈprusʲ(ː)ɪjə]; German: Preußen [ˈpʁɔʏsn̩]; Latin: Pruthenia/Prussia/Borussia; Prussian: Prūsa) is a historical region in Central Europe on the south-eastern coast of the Baltic Sea that ranges from the Vistula delta in the west to the end of the Curonian Spit in the east and extends inland as far as Masuria, divided between Poland (Warmian–Masurian Voivodeship), Russia (Kaliningrad Oblast) and Lithuania (Lithuania Minor). This region is often also referred to as Old Prussia.

Tacitus's Germania (98 AD) is the oldest known record of an eyewitness account on the territory and its inhabitants. Suiones, Sitones, Goths and other Germanic people had temporarily settled to the east and west of the Vistula River during the Migration Period, adjacent to the Aesti, who lived further to the east.

== Overview ==
The region's inhabitants of the Middle Ages were first called Bruzi in the brief text of the Bavarian Geographer and have since been referred to as Old Prussians. Beginning in 997 AD, they repeatedly defended themselves against conquest attempts by the newly created Duchy of the Polans. The territories of the Old Prussians and the neighboring Curonians and Livonians were politically unified in the 1230s under the State of the Teutonic Order. The former kingdom and later state of Prussia (1701–1947) derived its name from the region.

The Teutonic Knights invaded and annexed the region of Pomerelia from Poland into their monastic state, which already included historical Prussia, located east of the region. After the acquisition of Pomerelia in 1308–1310, the meaning of the term Prussia was widened in the German terminology to include areas west of the Vistula, including Vistula/Eastern Pomerania, although it was never inhabited by Baltic Prussians but by the Slavic Poles. After the area was reintegrated with Poland in 1466 both names were in use: Pomerania was used when referring to the Pomeranian Voivodeship (Gdańsk Pomerania) and the Chełmno Voivodeship, while Royal Prussia was used as the name of the wider province, which, however, also included the Malbork Voivodeship and the Prince-Bishopric of Warmia, covering the Prussian historical areas of Pomesania, Pogesania and Warmia, the only actual Prussian territories of the province, while the rump Teutonic state, called the Monastic Prussia thereafter, formed a part of Poland as a fief, finally secularised in 1525 to become the Lutheran Ducal Prussia.

Brandenburg Electors obtained the separation of the Duchy of Prussia from Poland in 1660, taking advantage of the Russo-Swedish Deluge, and merged it with the Electorate of Brandenburg to form Brandenburg-Prussia, shortly thereafter becoming the Kingdom of Prussia. Subsequently, it entered into an alliance with Austria and Russia, invading Polish territories of Royal Prussia, annexing and dividing it, with its bulk (including Pomerelia and the Malbork Land comprising northern parts of Pomesania and Pogesania) forming (along with the northern part of Greater Poland detached from the Grand Duchy of Posen) the Province of West Prussia, while Warmia was assigned to East Prussia, with both West and East Prussia remaining outside the German Confederation. In contrast, the Lauenburg and Bütow Land was annexed in 1777 immediately into the Province of Pomerania, but remained outside the Holy Roman Empire and was incorporated in 1815 only into its successor, the German Confederation, continuing to be a part of the Diocese of Chełmno.

The Province of East Prussia (the original Prussia) and the annexed Polish territories turned into the Province of West Prussia were merged in 1829 to form a single Province of Prussia, a part of the kingdom remaining outside of Germany (Note: However, the constitution promulgated by the Frankfurt Parliament attempted to incorporate the Province of Prussia, as well as the western and northern parts of the Province of Posen into the short-lived German Empire (1848–1849).) until the creation of the North German Confederation in 1866 during the unification of Germany. The merged territory was, however, again split into East and West Prussia in 1878.

East Prussia, West Prussia, the Province of Posen and the Starostwo of Draheim were annexed by Germany upon the formation of North German Confederation in 1866 and became a target of aggressive Germanization, German settlement, anti-Catholic campaigns (Kulturkampf), as well as disfranchisement and expropriations of Poles.

After the Treaty of Versailles, only the predominantly German-speaking western and eastern rim of the former West Prussia remained a part of Germany, forming part of the rump province of Posen-West Prussia (except for the Lauenburg and Bütow Land remaining a part of the Province of Pomerania, as well as the Regierungsbezirk Westpreussen which was made part of East Prussia), while its bulk was awarded to the recreated Polish state.

On the other hand, only minor part of East Prussia around Działdowo was transferred to Poland, the Klaipėda Region formed a free city supervised by the League of Nations, annexed following the Klaipėda Revolt by Lithuania but reclaimed by Germany in 1939, while the bulk (including entire Warmia and most of Masuria) remained within the Free State of Prussia, a successor of the Kingdom of Prussia and a constituent part of the German Weimar Republic, following the 1920 East Prussian plebiscite.

Since its conquest by the Red Army with evacuation and expulsion of the German-speaking inhabitants in 1945 in accordance with the Potsdam Agreement, the region of Prussia remains divided between northern Poland (most of the Warmian-Masurian Voivodeship, and the four counties of Pomeranian Voivodeship east of Vistula), Russia's Kaliningrad exclave, and southwestern Lithuania (former Klaipėda Region).

== History ==
=== Prehistory and early history ===
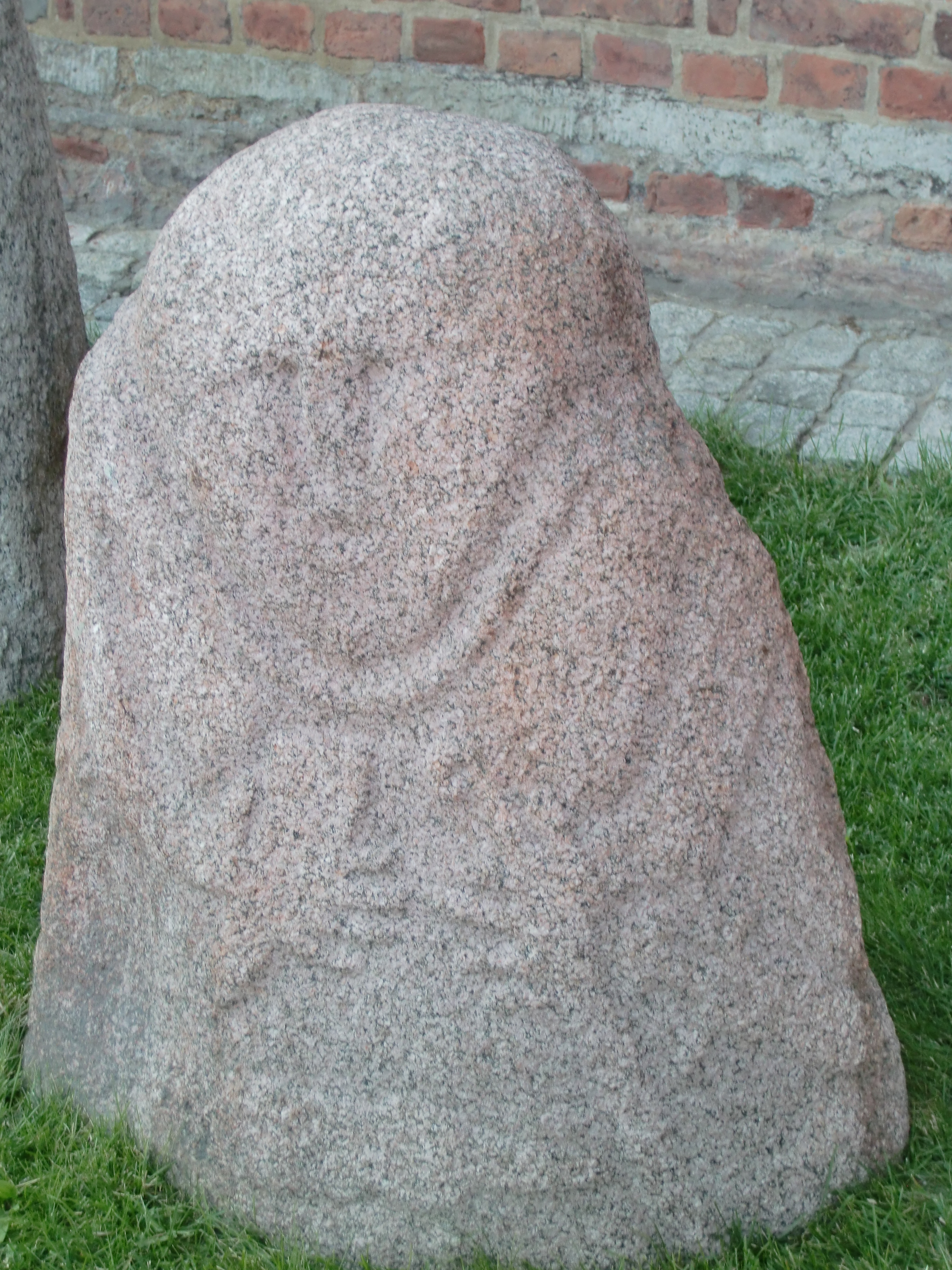
A Prussian Hag – Old Prussian statue, now in Gdańsk, Poland

Indo-European settlers first arrived in the region during the 4th millennium BC, which in the Baltic would diversify into the satem Balto-Slavic branch which would ultimately give rise to the Balts as the speakers of the Baltic languages. The Balts would have become differentiated into Western and Eastern Balts in the late 1st millennium BC. The region was inhabited by ancestors of Western Balts – Old Prussians, Sudovians/Jotvingians, Scalvians, Nadruvians, and Curonians while the eastern Balts settled in what is now Lithuania, Latvia and Belarus.

The Greek explorer Pytheas (4th century BC) may have referred to the territory as Mentenomon and to the inhabitants as Guttones (neighbours of the Teutones, probably referring to the Goths). A river to the east of the Vistula was called the Guttalus, perhaps corresponding to the Nemunas, the Łyna, or the Pregola. In AD 98, Tacitus described one of the tribes living near the Baltic Sea (Latin: Mare Suebicum) as Aestiorum gentes and amber-gatherers.

The Vikings started to penetrate the southeastern shores of the Baltic Sea in the 7th and 8th centuries. The largest trade centres of the Prussians, such as Truso and Kaup, seem to have absorbed a number of Norse people. Prussians used the Baltic Sea as a trading route, frequently travelling from Truso to Birka (in present-day Sweden).

At the end of the Viking Age, the sons of Danish kings Harald Bluetooth and Cnut the Great launched several expeditions against the Prussians. They destroyed many areas in Prussia, including Truso and Kaup, but failed to dominate the population totally. A Viking (Varangian) presence in the area was "less than dominant and very much less than imperial."

=== Old Prussians ===
The Prussian tribes in the context of the Baltic tribes, c. 1200. Borders are approximations.

According to a legend, recorded by Simon Grunau, the name Prussia is derived from Pruteno (or Bruteno), the chief priest of Prussia and brother of the legendary king Widewuto, who lived in the 6th century. The regions of Prussia and the corresponding tribes are said to bear the names of Widewuto's sons — for example, Sudovia is named after Widewuto's son Sudo.

The Old Prussians spoke a variety of languages, with Old Prussian belonging to the Western branch of the Baltic language group. Old Prussian, or related Western Baltic dialects, may have been spoken as far southeast as Masovia and even Belarus in the early medieval period, but these populations would probably have undergone Slavicization before the 10th century.

The territory was identified as Brus in the 8th-century map of the Bavarian Geographer and Bruzze/Pruzze/Przze in the Dagome iudex. Adam of Bremen mentions Prussians as Prusos/Pruzzi in 1072., while Gallus Anonymous mentions Prussia in his Gesta principum Polonorum in 1113. In the first half of the 13th century, Bishop Christian of Prussia recorded the history of a much earlier era. In Neo-Latin the area is called Borussia and its inhabitants Borussi.

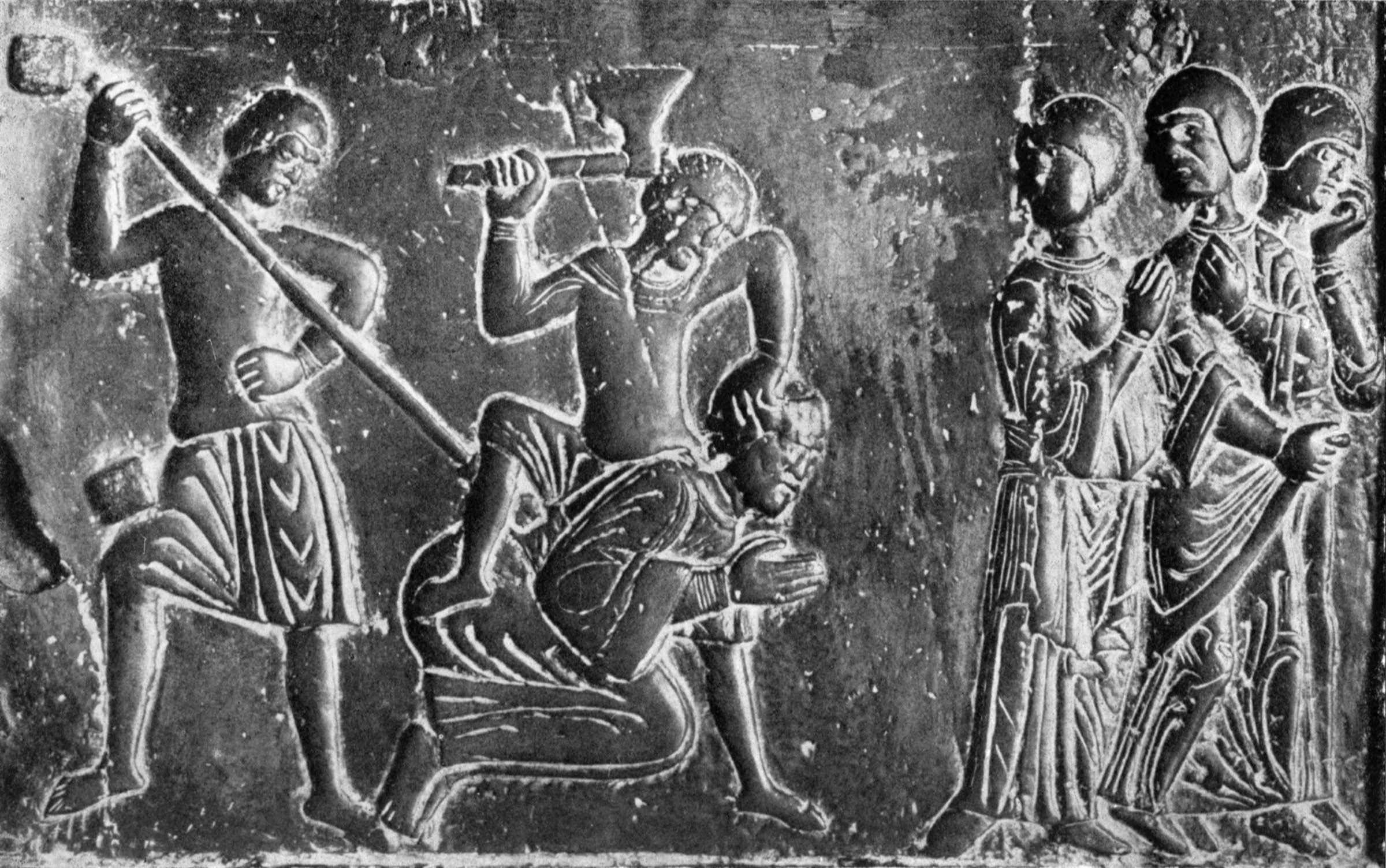
Medieval depiction of Prussians killing Saint Adalbert, the missionary bishop; part of the Gniezno Doors, c. 1175

After the Christianisations of the West Slavs in the 10th century, the state of the Polans was established and there were first attempts at conquering and baptizing the Baltic peoples. Bolesław I Chrobry sent Adalbert of Prague in 997 on a military and Christianizing mission. Adalbert, accompanied by armed guards, attempted to convert the Prussians to Christianity. He was killed by a Prussian pagan priest in 997. In 1015, Bolesław sent soldiers again, with some short-lived success, gaining regular paid tribute from some Prussians in the border regions, but it did not last. Polish rulers sent invasions to the territory in 1147, 1161–1166, and a number of times in the early 13th century. While these were repelled by the Prussians, the Chełmno Land became exposed to their frequent raids.

At that time, Pomerelia belonged to the diocese of Włocławek. Chełmno Land (including Michałów Land and later Lubawa Land) belonged in turn to the diocese of Płock, since 1223 governed in the name of the Bishop of Płock by Christian of Oliva, a missionary bishop appointed for Prussia in 1216.

=== Christianization and the Teutonic Knights ===
In the beginning of the 13th century, Konrad of Mazovia had called for Crusades and tried unsuccessfully to conquer Prussia for years. Bishop Christian of Oliva established the Order of Dobrzyń in order to defend Masovia against the raids of Old Prussians. However, the rather innumerous order (initially 15 knights, with 35 knights at its highest) did not prove effective in countering Prussians in battle. Christian achieved subjugation and conversion of Prussians only in the Lubawa Land. Therefore, the pope set up further crusades.

The Duke finally invited the Teutonic Knights in 1226, expelled by force of arms by King Andrew II of Hungary in the previous year following their attempts to build their own state within Transylvania. The Knights were expected to fight the inhabitants of Prussia in exchange for a fief of Chełmno Land. Prussia was conquered by the Teutonic Knights during the Prussian Crusade and administered within their State of the Teutonic Order, which begins the process of Germanization in the area. Bishop Christian had to deal with the constant cut-back of his autonomy by the Knights and asked the Roman Curia for mediation. In 1243, the Papal legate William of Modena divided the Prussian lands of the Order's State into four dioceses, whereby the bishops retained the secular rule over about one third of the diocesan territory:

- Bishopric of Chełmno (Chełmno Land and Lubawa Land)
- Bishopric of Pomesania (Pomesania)
- Bishopric of Warmia (state)/ Diocese of Warmia (ecclesiastical ambit)
- Bishopric of Samland (Sambia)

all suffragan dioceses under the Archbishopric of Riga. Christian was supposed to choose one of them, but did not agree to the division. He possibly retired to the Cistercians Abbey in Sulejów, where he died before the conflict was solved.

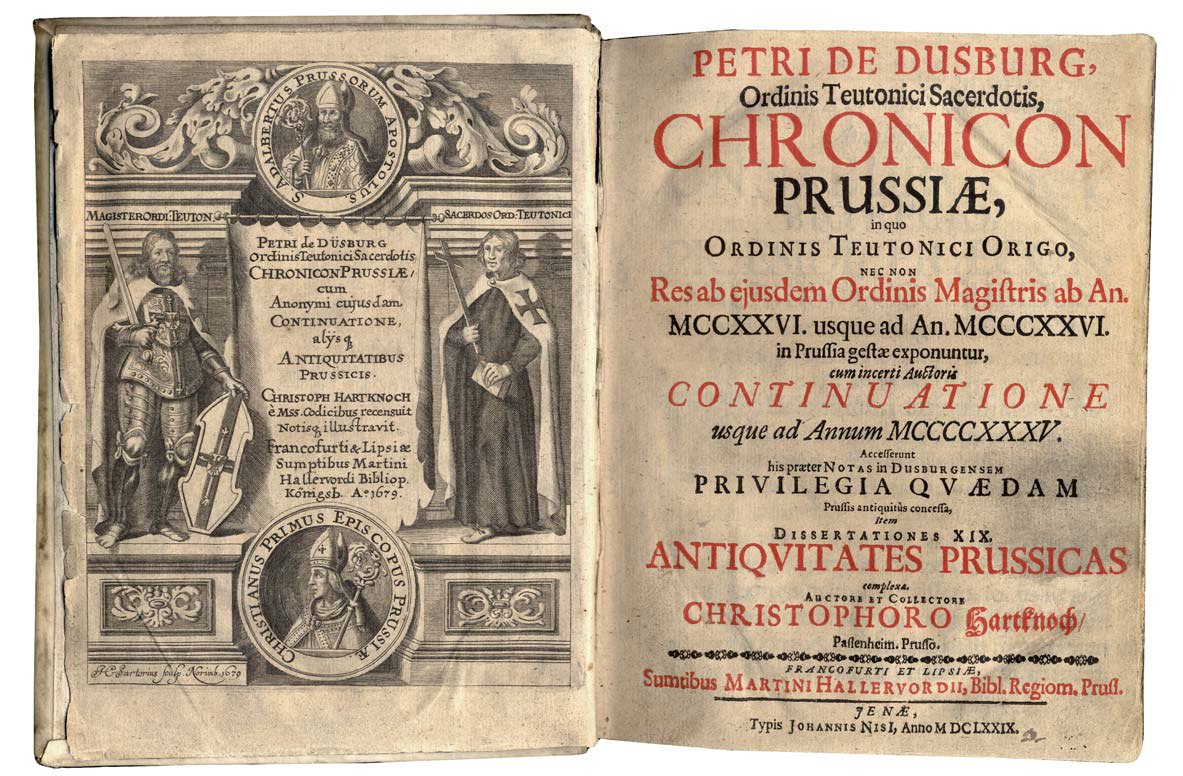
The Chronicon terrae Prussiae is the first major chronicle of the Teutonic Order in Prussia.

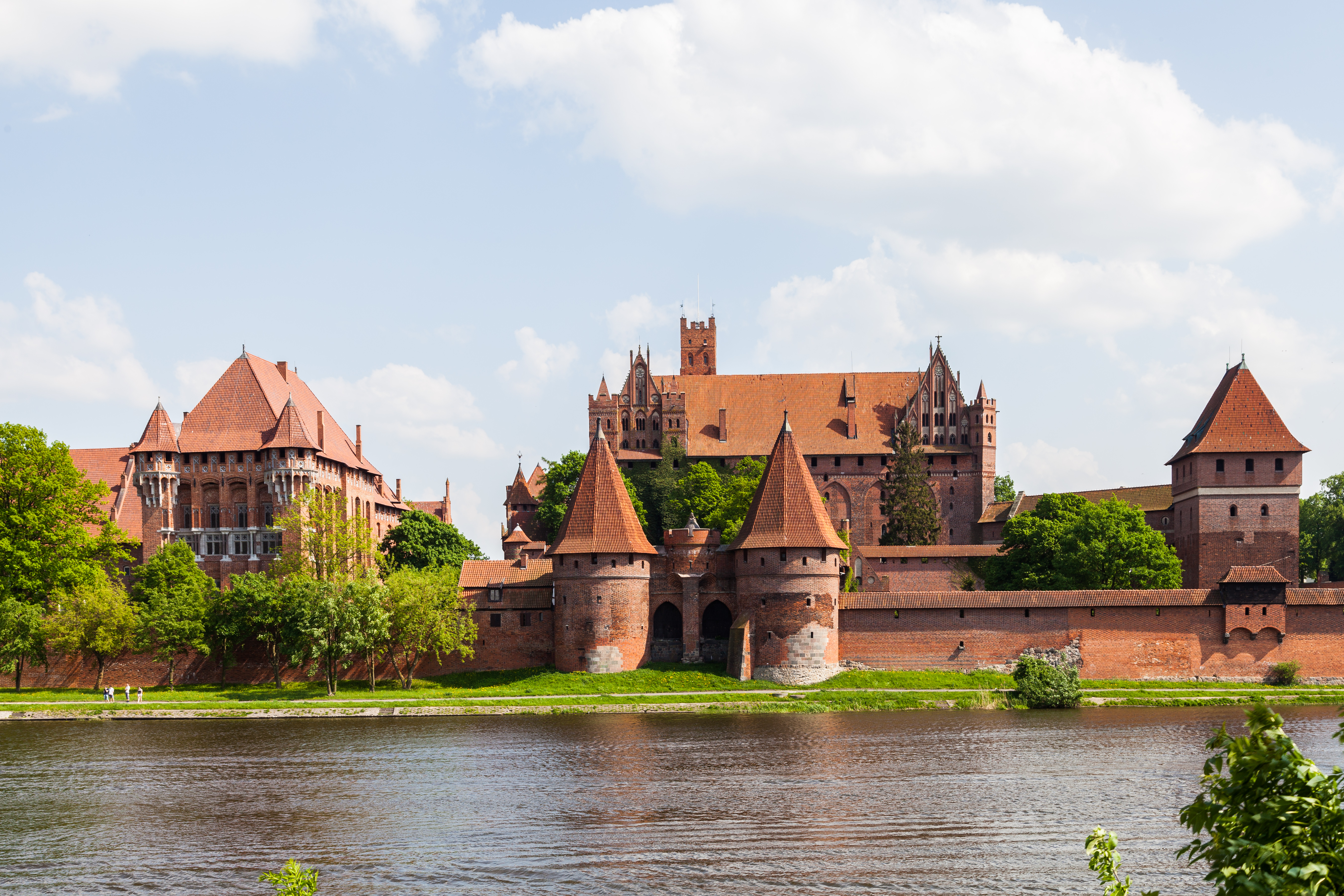
The political center of Prussia until 1457 was the Ordensburg Marienburg in what is now Malbork, Poland.

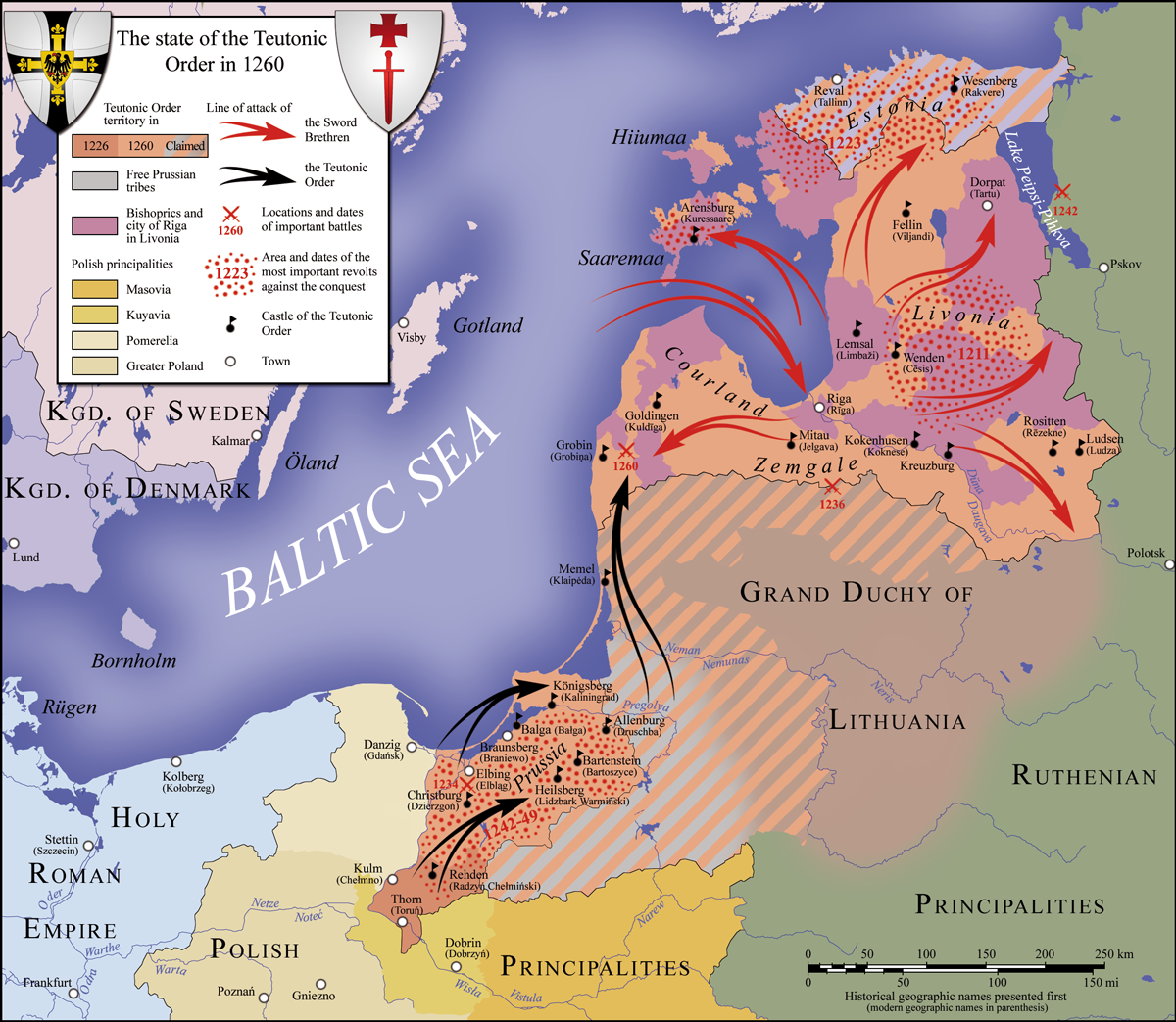
Monastic State of the Teutonic Knights c. 1260

The city of Königsberg (modern Kaliningrad) was founded in 1255, and joined the Hanseatic League in 1340, thus connecting Prussia to the European trade network spanning via the North Sea and the Baltic Sea. In 1492, a life of Saint Dorothea of Montau, published in Marienburg (Malbork), became the first printed publication in Prussia.

"Prussian land was my father's land and I will claim its territory till Osa river i.e. all the Prussian lands until the Vistula River, including Pamede, because this is my inheritance"

— Vytautas the Great's statement in no uncertain terms in 1413, long after the Battle of Grunwald, during the negotiations with the Teutonic Knights. Moreover, in 1421, the Lithuanian representatives emphasized the territorial and cultural links between Lithuanians, Sudovia, and old Yotvingian lands, but the Order continued to enjoy the support of the Holy Roman Empire, and the Western nobility (e.g. French, English).

=== Royal Prussia and Ducal Prussia ===
The region of Pomerelia (including Gdańsk Pomerania and the city of Gdańsk as its parts) was occupied by the monastic state of the Teutonic Knights (which already included historical Prussia, located east of the region) in 1308, following a Teutonic takeover of the region from Poland. After the acquisition of Pomerelia in 1308–1310, the meaning of the term Prussia was widened in the German terminology to include areas west of the Vistula, including Vistula/Eastern Pomerania. The possession of Danzig and Pomerelia by the Teutonic Order was questioned consistently by the Polish kings Władysław I and Casimir the Great in legal suits in the papal court in 1320 and 1333. Both times, as well as in 1339, the Teutonic Knights were ordered by the Pope to return Pomerelia and other lands back to Poland, but did not comply. The conquered Danzig (Gdańsk) joined the Hanseatic League in 1361. These events resulted in a series of Polish–Teutonic Wars throughout the 14th and 15th centuries. Under the Teutonic rule, an influx of western, mainly German-speaking farmers, traders and craftsmen was encouraged. Subsequent rebellions organized by the local population against the Teutonic state, initially by the Lizard Union and later by the Prussian Confederation, both pledging allegiance to the Polish king, caused the Thirteen Years' War which ultimately led to the Second Peace of Thorn, when most of the region and was reclaimed by Poland and henceforth formed the bulk of Royal Prussia.

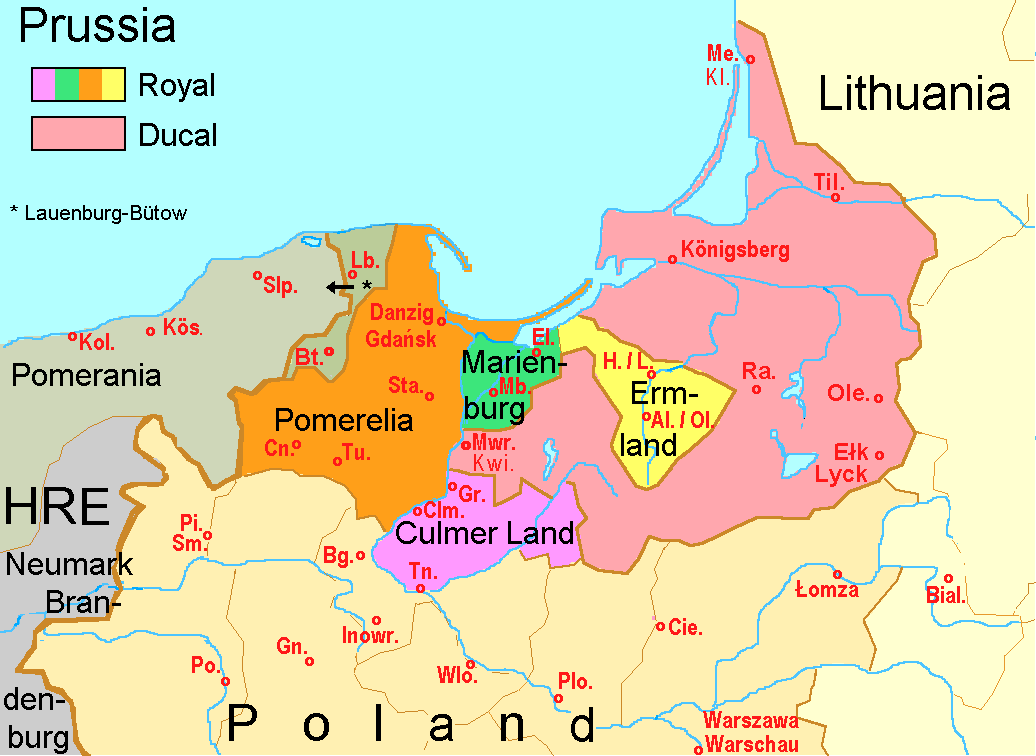
Pomerelia and Prussia after 1466: Teutonic/Monastic (later Ducal) Prussia voivodeships of Royal Prussia encompassing the historical region of Prussia voivodeships of Royal Prussia encompassing the Pomerelian territory outside of the region of historical Prussia

With the Second Peace of Thorn (1466), the territory of the Monastic State was divided into eastern and western parts. The western part became the province of Royal Prussia (later also part of the Greater Poland Province) of the Kingdom of Poland, while the eastern part of the monastic state became a fief and protectorate of Poland, also considered an integral part of the "one and indivisible" Kingdom of Poland, initially called Monastic Prussia or Teutonic Prussia, secularised in 1525 to become Ducal Prussia. At the same time, the Polish monarchs assumed the title of the King of Prussia.

Royal Prussia consisted of the Prince-Bishopric of Warmia and three newly formed voivodeships: the Pomeranian Voivodeship, the voivodeship of Chełmno and the voivodeship of Malbork. Initially enjoying broad autonomy including an own local legislature, the Prussian Estates, and maintaining its own laws, customs and rights, Royal Prussia was ultimately re-absorbed directly into the Crown of the Kingdom of Poland, following the Union of Lublin in 1569. The locally spoken language differed among social classes, with the aristocracy and urban burghers initially highly Germanised as a result of earlier Teutonic policies, but gradually shifting towards Polish in the later years, while the peasantry continued as predominantly Kashubian- and Polish-speaking West of Vistula; the part East of Vistula was predominantly German-speaking, with decreasing number of Old Prussian and increasing number of Polish minorities.

In 1525, the last Grand Master reigning in the State of the Teutonic Order, Albert of Brandenburg, a member of a cadet branch of the House of Hohenzollern, adopted the Lutheran faith, resigned his position, and assumed the title of "Duke of Prussia". In a deal partially brokered by Martin Luther, the Duchy of Prussia became the first Protestant state and a vassal of Poland. The ducal capital of Königsberg, now Kaliningrad, became a centre of learning and printing through the establishment of the Albertina University in 1544 for not only the dominant German culture, but also the thriving Polish and Lithuanian communities as well. It was in Königsberg that the first Lutheran books in Polish, Lithuanian, and Prussian languages were published.

=== Brandenburg–Prussia ===
Rulership of Ducal Prussia passed to the senior Hohenzollern branch, the ruling Electors of Brandenburg, in 1618, and Polish sovereignty over the duchy ended in 1657 with the Treaty of Wehlau. There was strong opposition to the separation of the region from Poland, especially in Königsberg. A confederation was formed in the city to maintain Poland's sovereignty over the city and region. The Brandenburg Elector and his army, however, entered the city and abducted and imprisoned the leader of the city's anti-Elector opposition Hieronymus Roth. In 1663, the city burghers, forced by Elector Frederick William, swore an oath of allegiance to him, however, in the same ceremony they still also pledged allegiance to Poland.

Taking advantage of the fact that Ducal Prussia lay outside of the Holy Roman Empire, Frederick I achieved the elevation of the duchy to a kingdom in 1701, styling himself King in Prussia, because his kingdom included only part of historic Prussia, and the title King of Prussia was still held by the Polish monarchs. Lithuanian culture thrived in the part of the region known as Lithuania Minor, while the Kursenieki lived along the coast in the vicinity of the Curonian and Vistula Spits.

The Old Prussian language had mostly disappeared by 1700. The last speakers may have died in the plague and famine that ravaged Prussia in 1709 to 1711. In 1724, King Frederick William I of Prussia prohibited Poles, Samogitians and Jews from settling in Lithuania Minor in the eastern part of the region, and initiated German colonization to change the region's ethnic composition.

The realm of the King in Prussia established in 1701 from the former Ducal Prussia subsequently entered into an alliance with Austria and Russia, invading Polish territories of Royal Prussia. In the First Partition of Poland, the King in Prussia gained majority of the territory of Royal Prussia including the Lauenburg and Bütow Land (but excluding Danzig and Toruń, which were captured along with the region of Greater Poland in the Second Partition of Poland), as well as the Starostwo of Draheim. The former Royal Prussia was divided in 1773. Its bulk, which included the historically Prussian Malbork Land (northern parts of Pomesania and Pogesania) but also the historically Polish Pomerelia (Vistula Pomerania) formed the newly established province of West Prussia. The historically Prussian Warmia was in turn integrated into East Prussia. In contrast, the Lauenburg and Bütow Land and the Starostwo of Draheim were annexed in 1777 immediately into the Province of Pomerania. The annexation of Royal Prussia allowed the Prussian king to assume the title of King of Prussia thereafter.

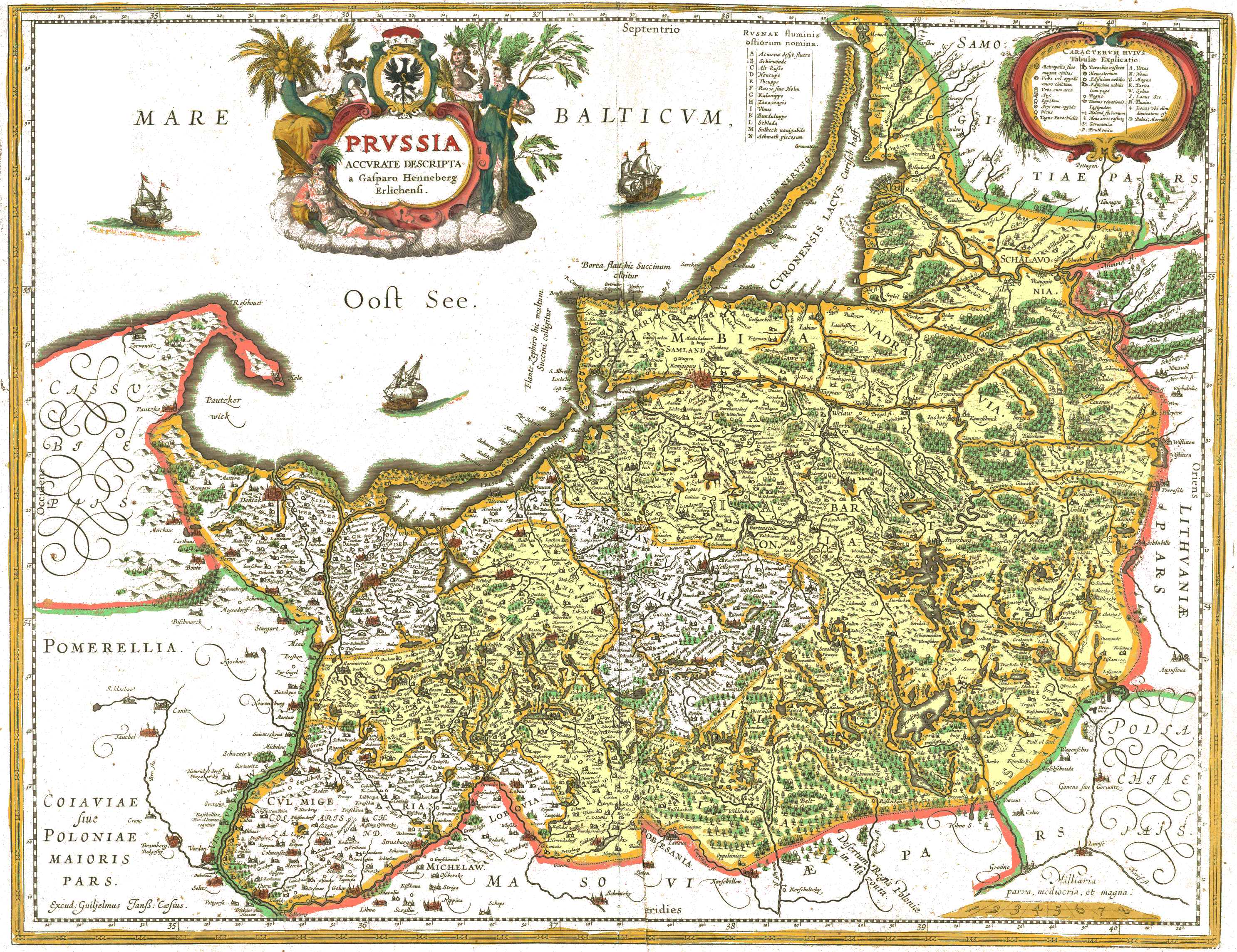
Map by Caspar Henneberg, Elbing, 1576: Duchy and Royal Prussia originally with same colour (for the duchy the colour was added later)

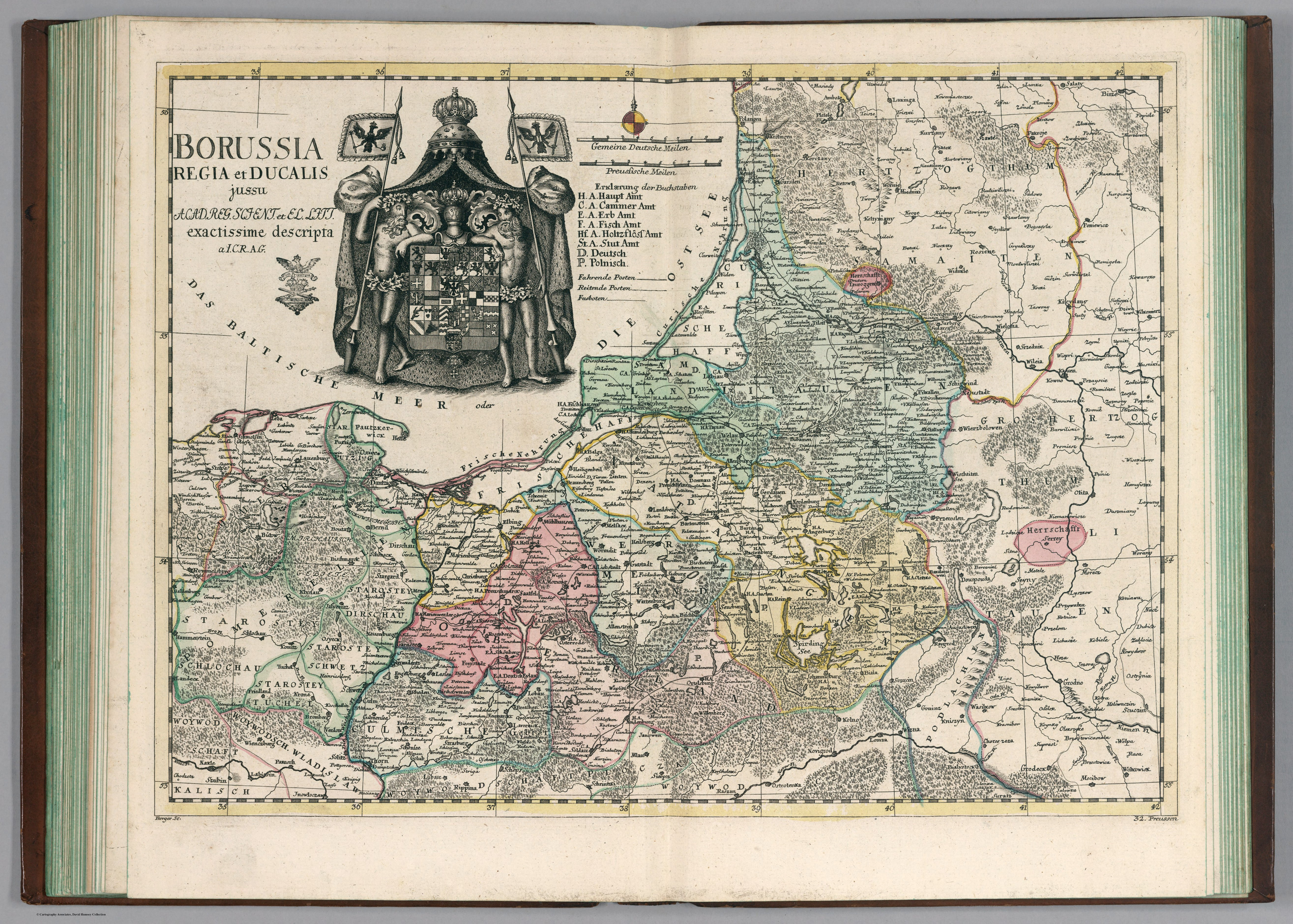
Map of Prussia by Leonhard Euler, 1753

=== Modern era ===
During the Napoleonic era the Greater Polish territories and the Chełmno Land formed part of the Duchy of Warsaw following the Treaties of Tilsit, and Danzig was granted a status of a Free City. However, after the Congress of Vienna, the Polish duchy was again partitioned between Russia and Prussia, with Prussia annexing the Free City and the Chełmno Land into the reconstituted West Prussia.

Though the Kingdom of Prussia was a member of the German Confederation established by the Congress of Vienna as a replacement for the dissolved Holy Roman Empire from 1815 to 1866, only those of the territories of the kingdom that were previously included in the HRE as well as the Lauenburg and Bütow Land and the former Starostwo of Draheim (both integrated into the Province of Pomerania) became part of the Confederation, while the Grand Duchy of Posen (later demoted to an ordinary Province of Posen following the failed Greater Poland uprising (1848)), the Provinces of West Prussia and East Prussia (merged in the years 1829 to 1878 to form a single Province of Prussia) remained outside of the German Confederation (thus of Germany) until the creation of the North German Confederation in 1866 at the start of the unification of Germany.

As agreed upon in the Treaty of Versailles, East Prussia, minus the Memelland, expanded by addition of the Regierungsbezirk Westpreussen (the only part of former West Prussia containing originally Prussian territory) remained within the Free State of Prussia, a successor of the Kingdom of Prussia and a constituent part of the German Weimar Republic, following the 1920 East Prussian plebiscite. The democratic government of the Free State was removed as a result of the 1932 Prussian coup d'état, which also facilitated the Nazi takeover of government. In the March 1933 German federal election, the last pre-war German elections, the local population of East Prussia voted overwhelmingly for Adolf Hitler's Nazi Party.

==== World War II ====
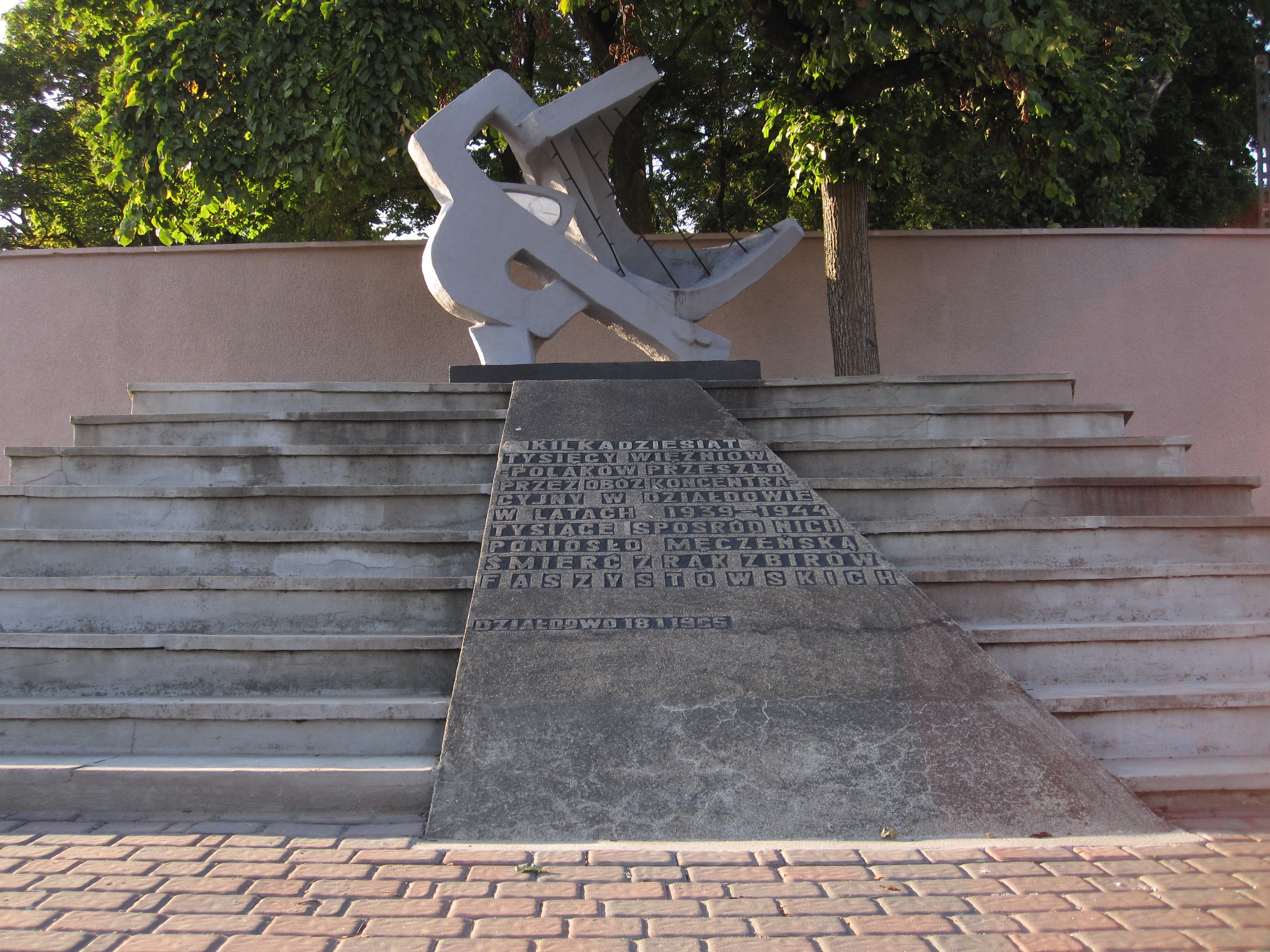
Memorial to the victims of the Soldau concentration camp in Działdowo

After the 1939 German ultimatum to Lithuania, the Klaipėda region was integrated again into East Prussia. During World War II, the Polish ethnic minorities of Catholic Warmians and Powiślans, as well as Lutheran Masurians were persecuted by the Nazi German government, which wanted to erase all aspects of Polish culture and Polish language in Warmia, Masuria and Powiśle. The Jews who remained in East Prussia in 1942 were shipped to concentration camps, including Theresienstadt in occupied Czechoslovakia, Kaiserwald in occupied Latvia, and camps in Minsk in occupied Byelorussian Soviet Socialist Republic.

The Pomeranian Voivodeship was occupied and illegally annexed by Nazi Germany during the invasion of Poland in 1939, as well as renamed Reichsgau Danzig-Westpreussen, with numerous German atrocities against the local population. Nazi Germany enlarged the territory of the province of East Prussia through annexation into it of parts of Northern Masovia under the name of Regierungsbezirk Zichenau, as well as of the Suwałki Region, both referred to as South East Prussia, in relation to the New East Prussia of the times of Polish Partitions (see above). At the same time, the Regierungsbezirk Westpreussen was separated from East Prussia and integrated into Reichsgau Danzig-Westpreussen.

The Soldau concentration camp and Hohenbruch concentration camp were operated in the region mostly for Polish prisoners, as well as several subcamps of the Stutthof concentration camp, and several prisoner-of-war camps for Allied POWs, including Polish, Belgian, British, French, Dutch, Serbian, Italian, Soviet, Australian, Canadian, New Zealander, South African, such as Stalag I-A, Stalag I-B, Stalag I-C, Stalag I-D, Stalag XX-B, Stalag Luft VI and Oflags 52, 53, 60 and 63 with numerous forced labour subcamps. Many expelled Poles from German-occupied Poland were enslaved by the Germans as forced labour in the region. There was also a camp for Romani people in Königsberg (see Romani Holocaust).

The Polish resistance movement was active in the region, with activities including distribution of Polish underground press, infiltration of the German arms industry, sabotage actions, executions of Nazis, theft of German weapons, ammunition and equipment, smuggling data on German concentration camps and prisons, and organization of transports of POWs who escaped German POW camps via the ports of Gdańsk and Gdynia to neutral Sweden.

Beginning in 1944 with the East Prussian offensive of Soviet troops, the German-speaking population was evacuated.

=== Contemporary era ===
The province of East Prussia ceased to exist in 1945, following the Potsdam Agreement, when it was divided between Poland and the Soviet Union, with the latter dividing its part further between the Lithuanian SSR and the Russian SFSR. The part assigned to Poland was organized as the provisional Masurian District, later reduced by the annexation of its northern strip with the towns of Gierdawy and Iławka by the Soviet Union, and transferring its westernmost counties to Gdańsk Voivodeship and easternmost counties to Białystok Voivodeship, and finally transformed into Olsztyn Voivodeship in 1946. The Klaipėda Region was returned to the Lithuanian SRR, while the remaining territory, annexed by the Russian FSSR, was in turn named the Kaliningrad Oblast in 1946. The inhabitants not evacuated during the war were expelled in accordance with the Potsdam Agreement, with the exception of Polish minorities of Powiślans, Warmians and Masurians, considered to be of Polish descent. The situation was different, however, for the Prussian Lithuanians in Lithuania Minor, a part of the Soviet share of the former East Prussia. The government of the Lithuanian SSR followed Soviet policy and viewed the Prussian Lithuanians as Germans. About 8,000 persons were repatriated from DP camps during 1945–50. However, their homes and farms were not returned as either Russians or Lithuanians had already occupied their property. Prussians who remained in the former Klaipėda Region were fired from their jobs and otherwise discriminated against. After the collapse of the Soviet Union, some Prussian Lithuanians and their descendants did not regain lost property in the Klaipėda region.

Prussia as a political entity was abolished on 25 February 1947 by decree of the Allied Control Council. The decree declared that Prussia from early days had been a bearer of militarism and reaction in Germany. In line with this assessment and the ideological justification of Recovered Territories, the use of Prussia as a geographic designation was discouraged by the postwar authorities of Poland and the Soviet Union. The Polish region of Pomerelia (Gdansk Pomerania and the Chełmno Land) reverted to its original name already prior to World War II, as the name West Prussia was always regarded in Poland as an artificial German invention. In the case of East Prussia (the original Prussia), Polish authorities promoted using the designations of Powiśle in the case of Pomesania and Pogesania, approximately translated in English: “Vistula Plains”, Warmia in the case of the former Prince-Bishopric of Warmia and Masuria in the case of the remainder of Polish share of the former East Prussia. The designation of Kaliningrad Oblast was promoted by the Soviet authorities in the case of the Russian part of the territory, instead. The policy was embraced by the Polish population who had hardly any sympathy for the legacy of Prussia, partially due to numerous attempts throughout history to annex various Polish territories with their subsequent artificial renaming as another part of Prussia in order to imply their originally Prussian history (see above), while the State of Prussia was perceived as a primary driving force for the Partitions of Poland with subsequent persecution and attempted Germanization of Poles, politically dominated by the Prussian Junkers with strong anti-Polish sentiment, and finally, the German Province of East Prussia was regarded as an area of persecutions against Polish-speaking minority (Warmians, Masurians, Powiślans), but most importantly as a Nazi political stronghold whose existence as an exclave resulted in German irredentist demands towards Poland, blamed as one of the primary causes of the calamity of World War II and the ensuing German atrocities.

Powiśle, Warmia and Masuria are now in Poland (most of the Warmian-Masurian Voivodeship, and the four counties of Pomeranian Voivodeship east of Vistula), the former Memelland or Klaipėda region is now divided between the Klaipėda and Tauragė counties of Lithuania, while the rest of the northern Prussia forms the Kaliningrad Oblast exclave of the Russian Federation. Only the latter part remains outside of the European Union.

== Subdivisions ==
- Historical parts
  - Western part: Pomesania, Pogesania, Galindia, Sasna
    - Malbork Land – northern part of Pomesania and Pogesania, corresponding to the former Malbork Voivodeship
    - Upper Prussia – the remainder that stayed with Monastic and later Ducal Prussia
  - Warmia
  - Lower Prussia
    - Scalovia (Klaipėda region)
    - Nadruvia
    - Sudovia
    - Bartia
    - Sambia
    - Natangia
- Distinct ethnocultural designations
  - Żuławy Wiślane (the part east of Vistula):
    - Wielkie Żuławy Malborskie
    - Żuławy Elbląskie
  - Powiśle (English: Vistula Plains), ethnocultural region grossly coextensive with the territory of the former Regierungsbezirk Westpreussen including Zalewo, but excluding Żuławy
  - Hockerland; much of Pogesania including Morąg, Pasłęk, Miłakowo and Młynary, but excluding its northernmost part formerly within Malbork Voivodeship, namely the area of Elbląg and Tolkmicko
  - Warmia
  - Masuria
  - Kursenieki, primarily the Curonian Spit
  - Lithuania Minor

== Largest cities ==
	City	Population (2023)	Country	Administrative region	Historic subregion
1	Kaliningrad	489,735	(Russia)	Kaliningrad Oblast	Sambia
2	Olsztyn	168,212	(Poland)	Warmian–Masurian Voivodeship	Warmia
3	Klaipėda	158,420	(Lithuania)	Klaipėda County	Lithuania Minor
4	Elbląg	113,567	(Poland)	Warmian–Masurian Voivodeship	Powiśle
5	Ełk	60,070	(Poland)	Warmian–Masurian Voivodeship	Masuria
6	Sovetsk	38,614	(Russia)	Kaliningrad Oblast	Lithuania Minor
7	Kwidzyn	37,011	(Poland)	Pomeranian Voivodeship	Powiśle
8	Malbork	36,938	(Poland)	Pomeranian Voivodeship	Powiśle
9	Chernyakhovsk	35,705	(Russia)	Kaliningrad Oblast	Lithuania Minor
10	Iława	32,245	(Poland)	Warmian–Masurian Voivodeship	Powiśle
11	Ostróda	31,488	(Poland)	Warmian–Masurian Voivodeship	Masuria
12	Gusev	28,820	(Russia)	Kaliningrad Oblast	Lithuania Minor
13	Giżycko	27,596	(Poland)	Warmian–Masurian Voivodeship	Masuria
14	Baltiysk	27,032	(Russia)	Kaliningrad Oblast	Sambia
15	Kętrzyn	25,487	(Poland)	Warmian–Masurian Voivodeship	Masuria/Bartia
16	Bartoszyce	21,682	(Poland)	Warmian–Masurian Voivodeship	Bartia
17	Szczytno	22,081	(Poland)	Warmian–Masurian Voivodeship	Masuria
18	Svetly	21,054	(Russia)	Kaliningrad Oblast	Sambia
19	Mrągowo	20,808	(Poland)	Warmian–Masurian Voivodeship	Masuria
20	Działdowo	20,367	(Poland)	Warmian–Masurian Voivodeship	Masuria
21	Pisz	17,828	(Poland)	Warmian–Masurian Voivodeship	Masuria
22	Braniewo	16,223	(Poland)	Warmian–Masurian Voivodeship	Warmia
23	Šilutė	16,200	(Lithuania)	Klaipėda County	Lithuania Minor
24	Olecko	15,792	(Poland)	Warmian–Masurian Voivodeship	Masuria
25	Lidzbark Warmiński	14,614	(Poland)	Warmian–Masurian Voivodeship	Warmia

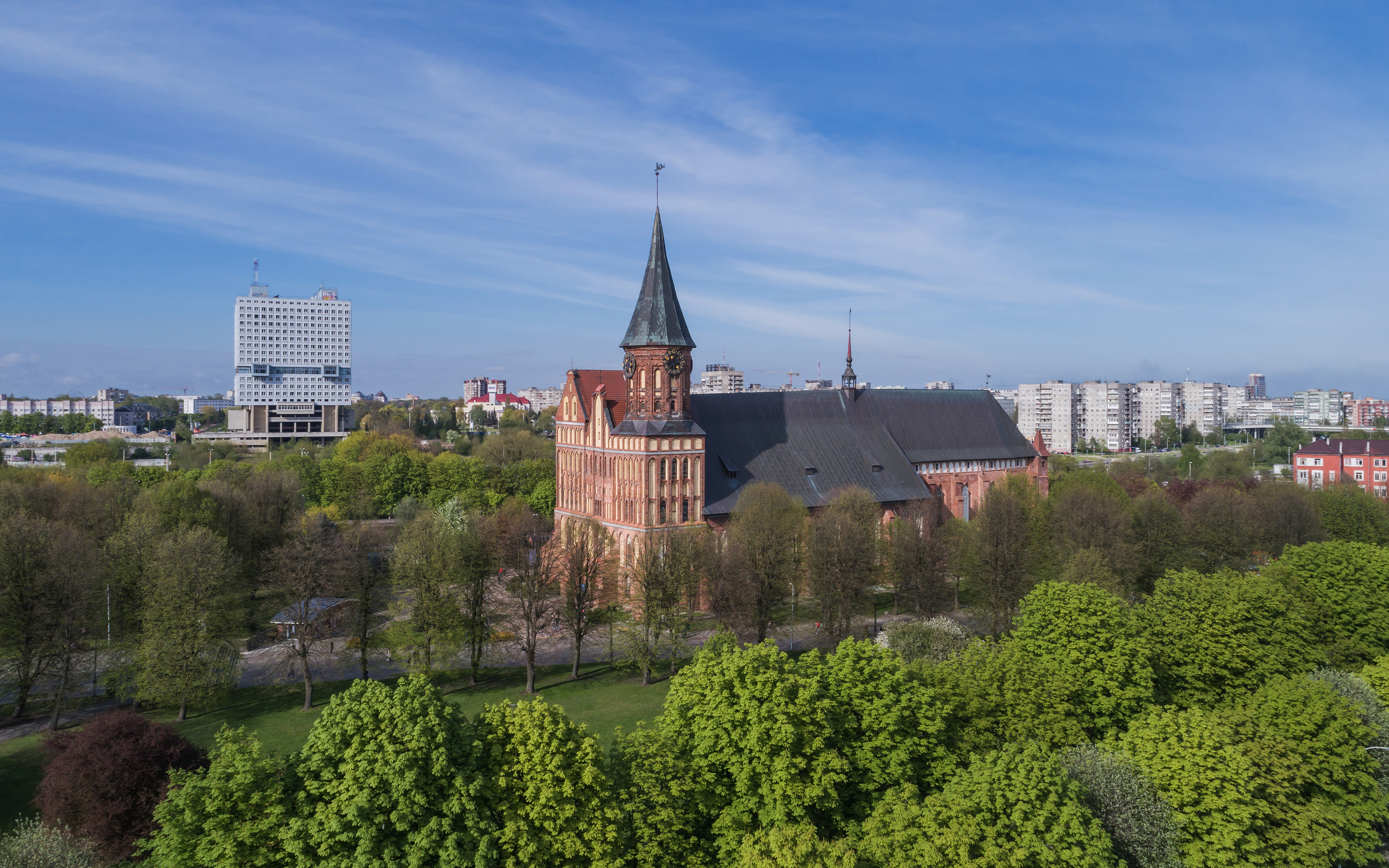
Kaliningrad

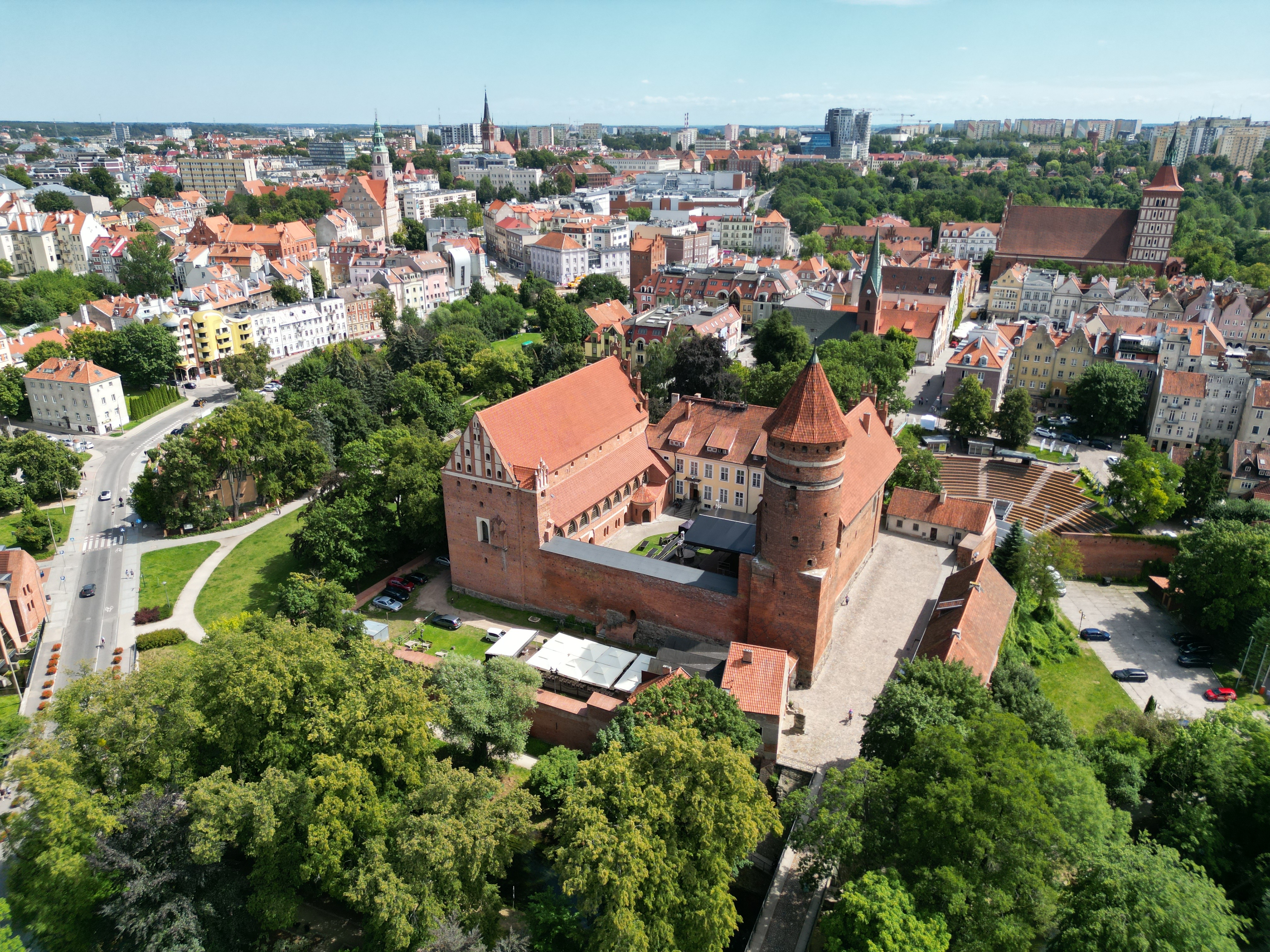
Olsztyn

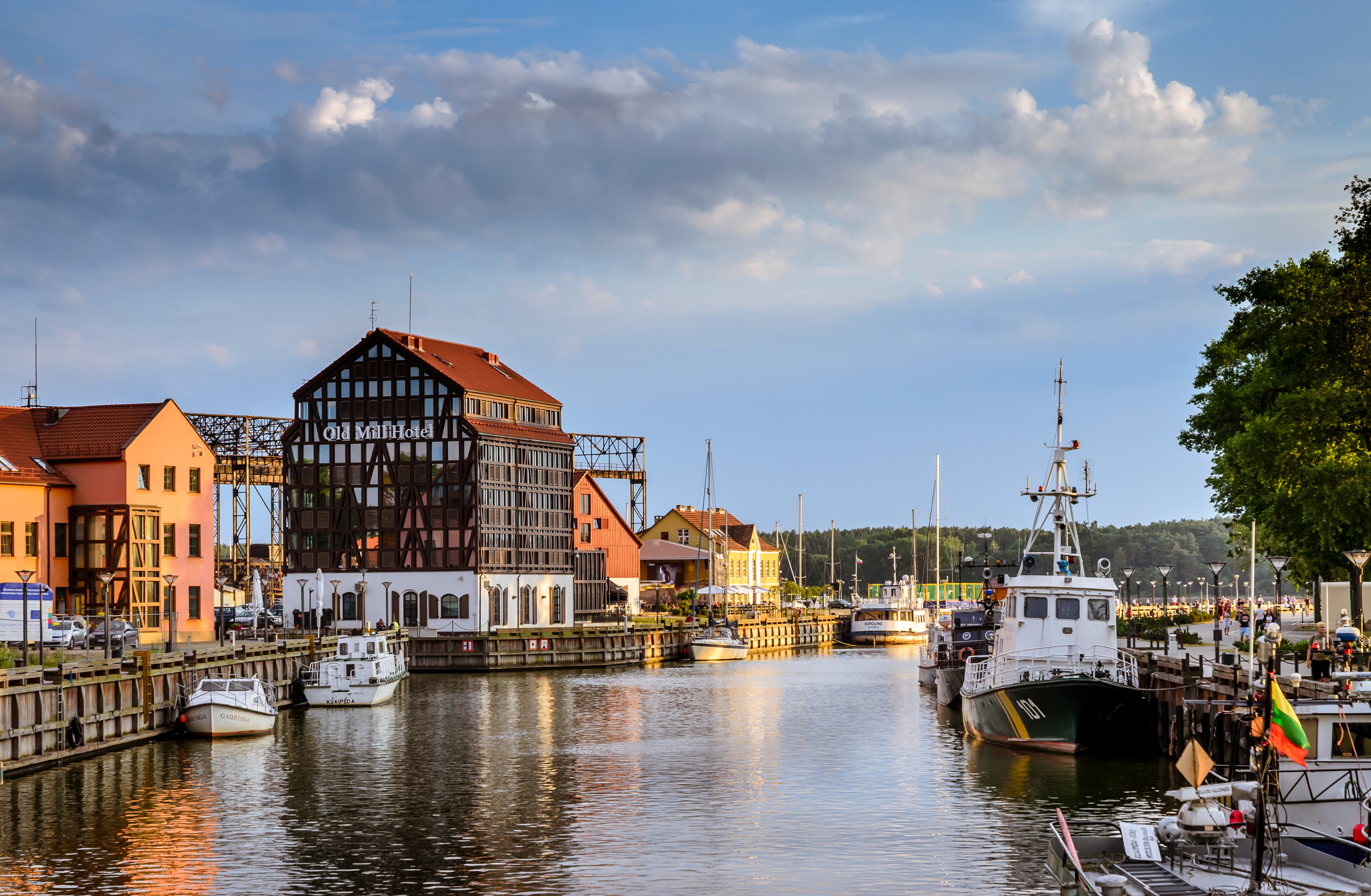
Klaipėda

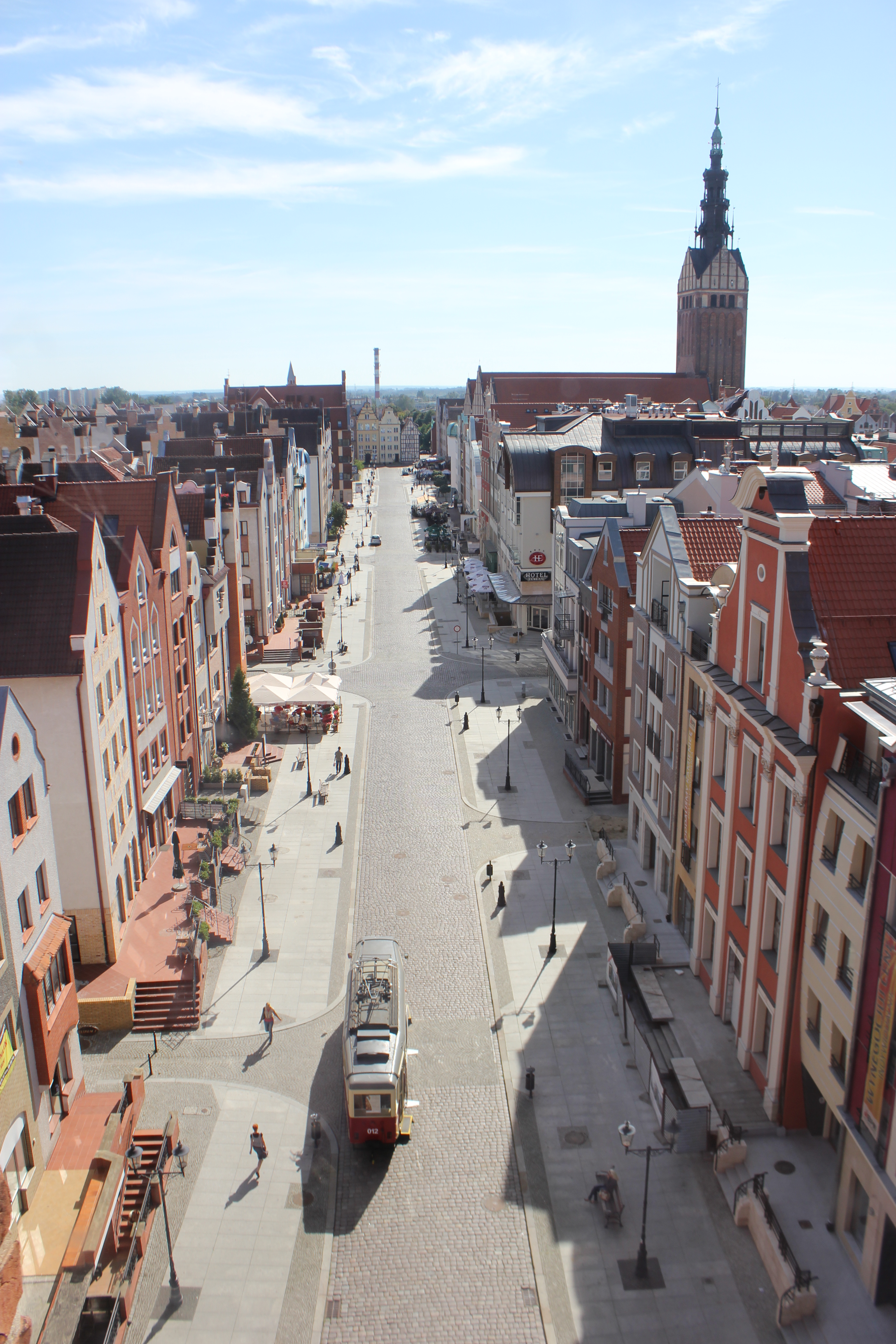
Elbląg

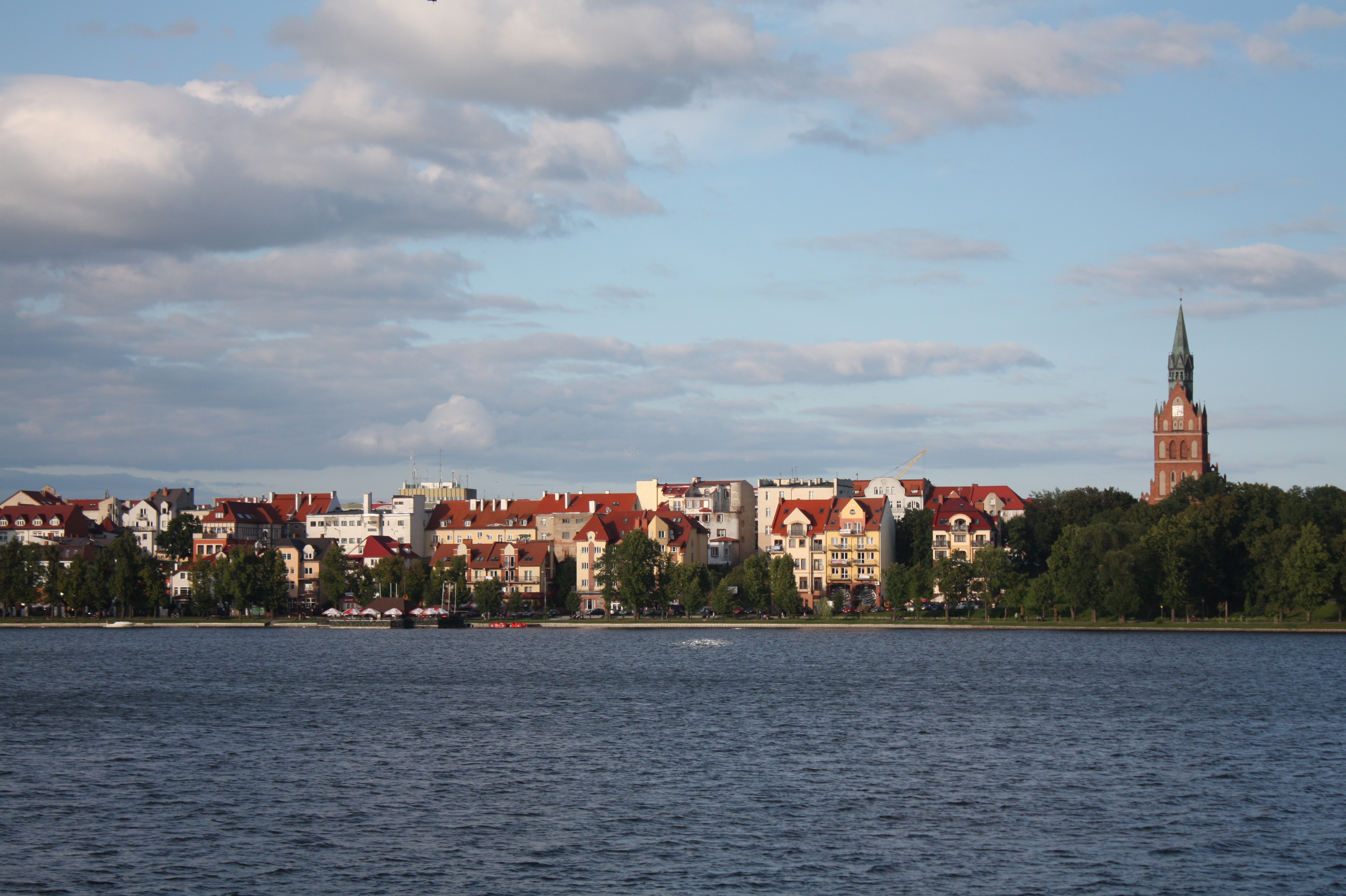
Ełk

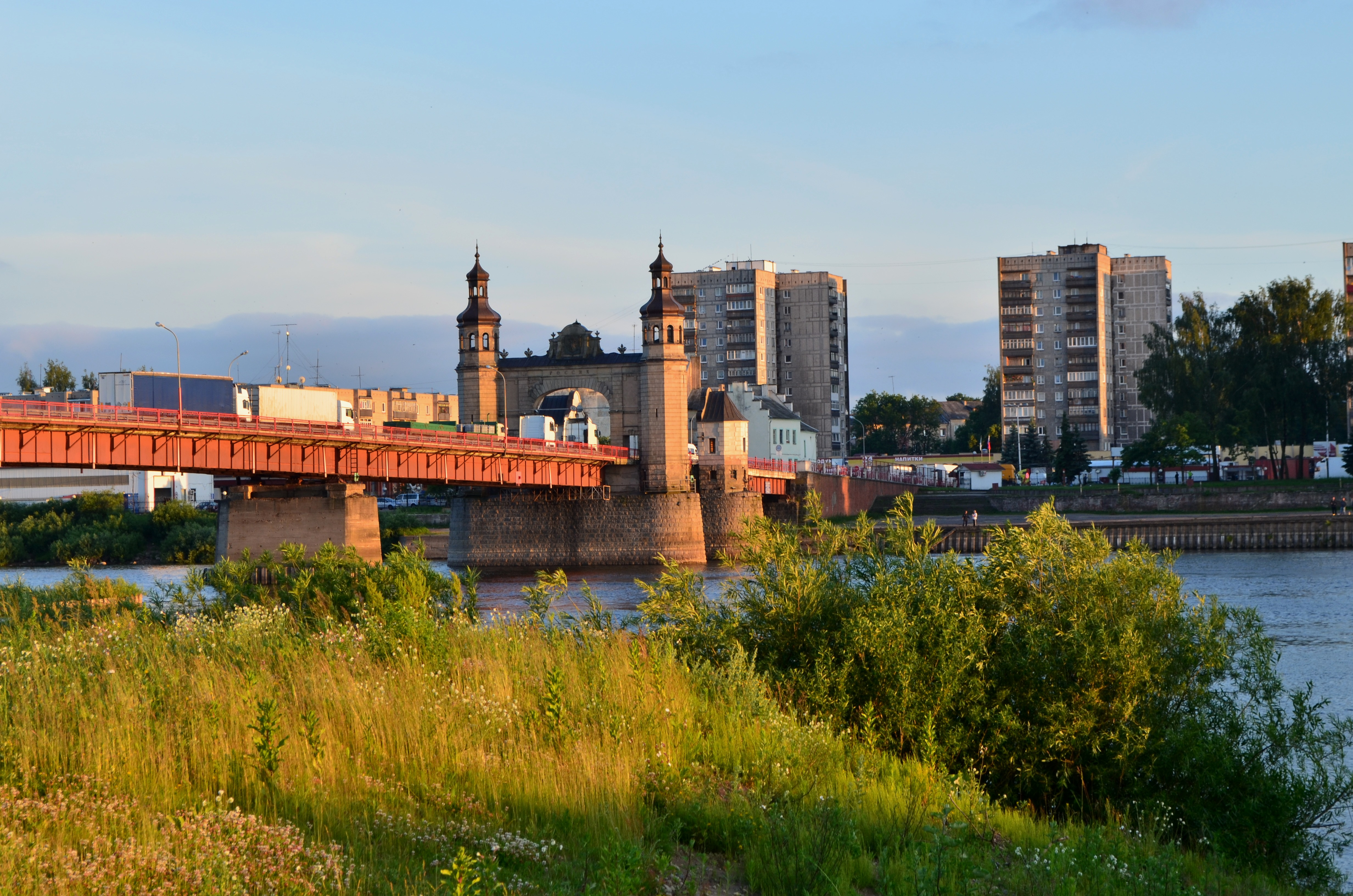
Sovetsk

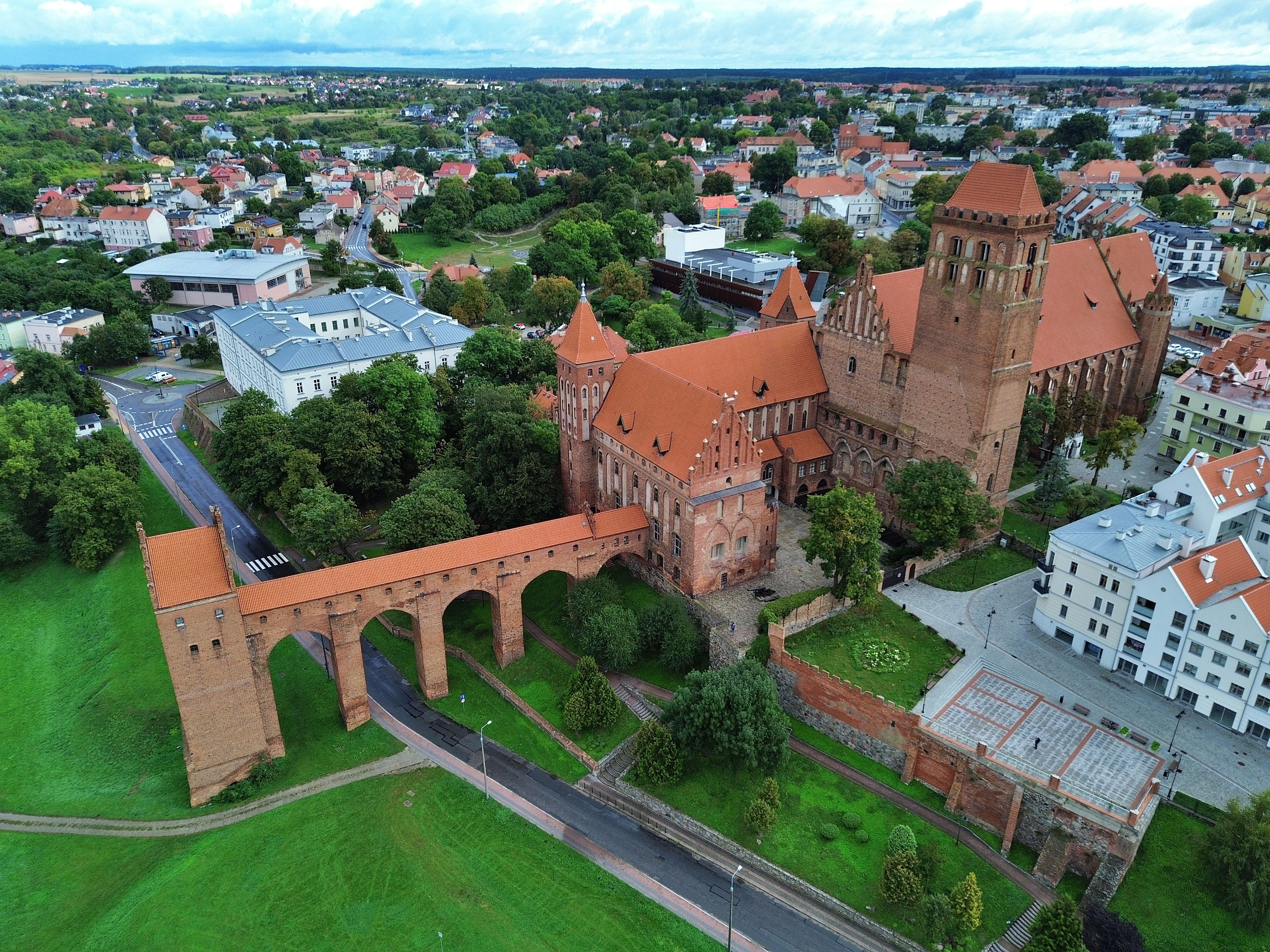
Kwidzyn

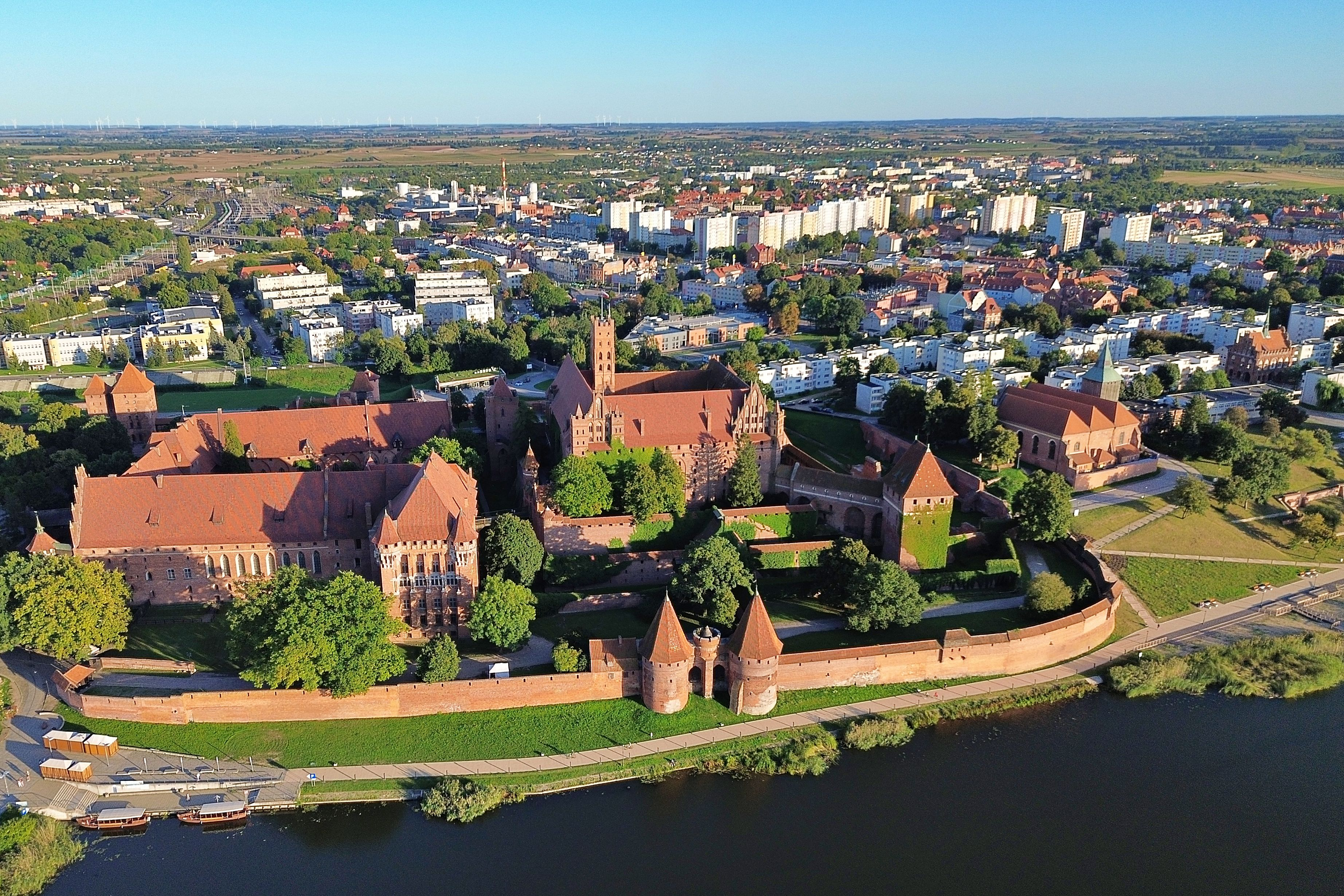
Malbork

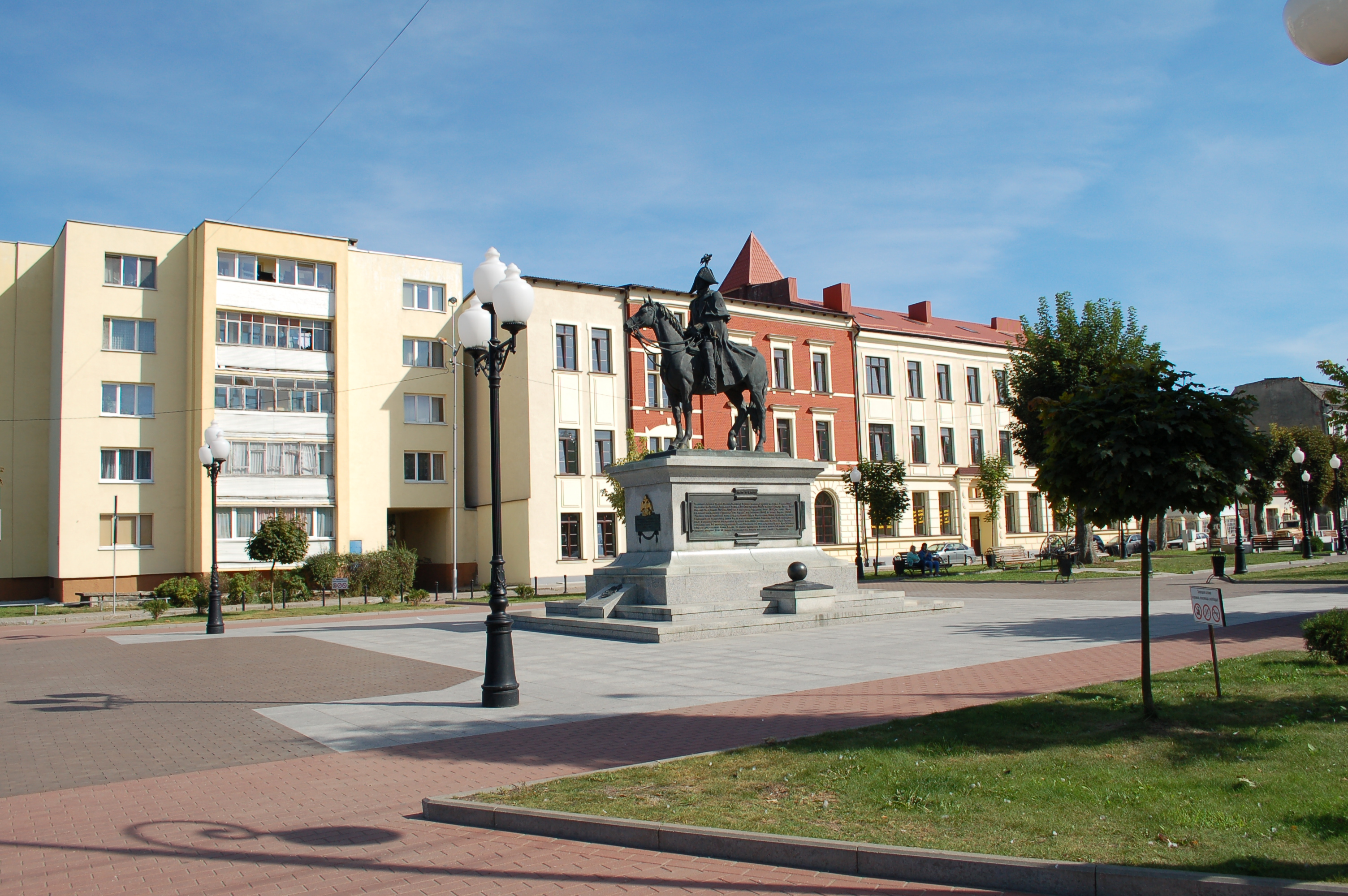
Chernyakhovsk

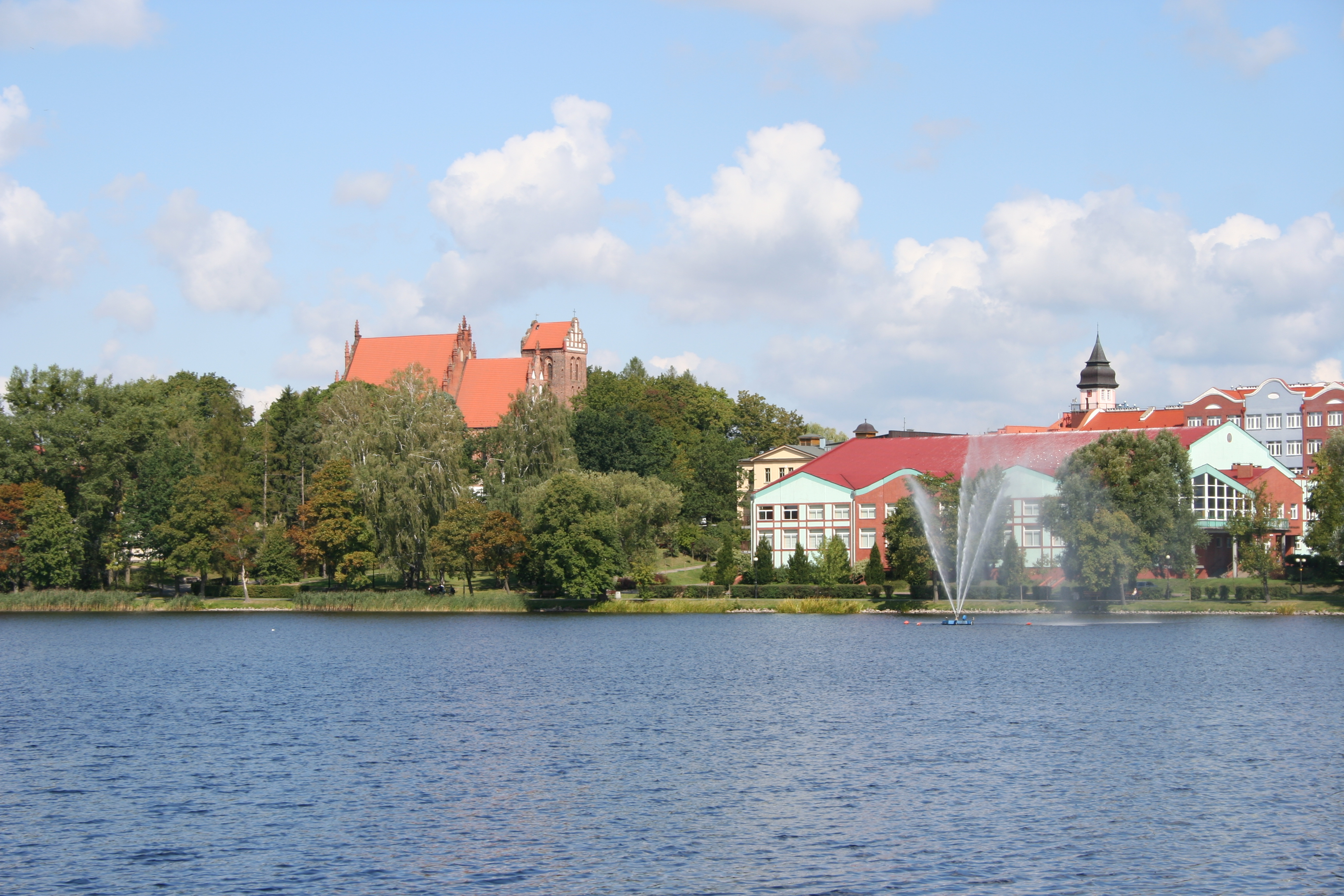
Iława

== Sights ==
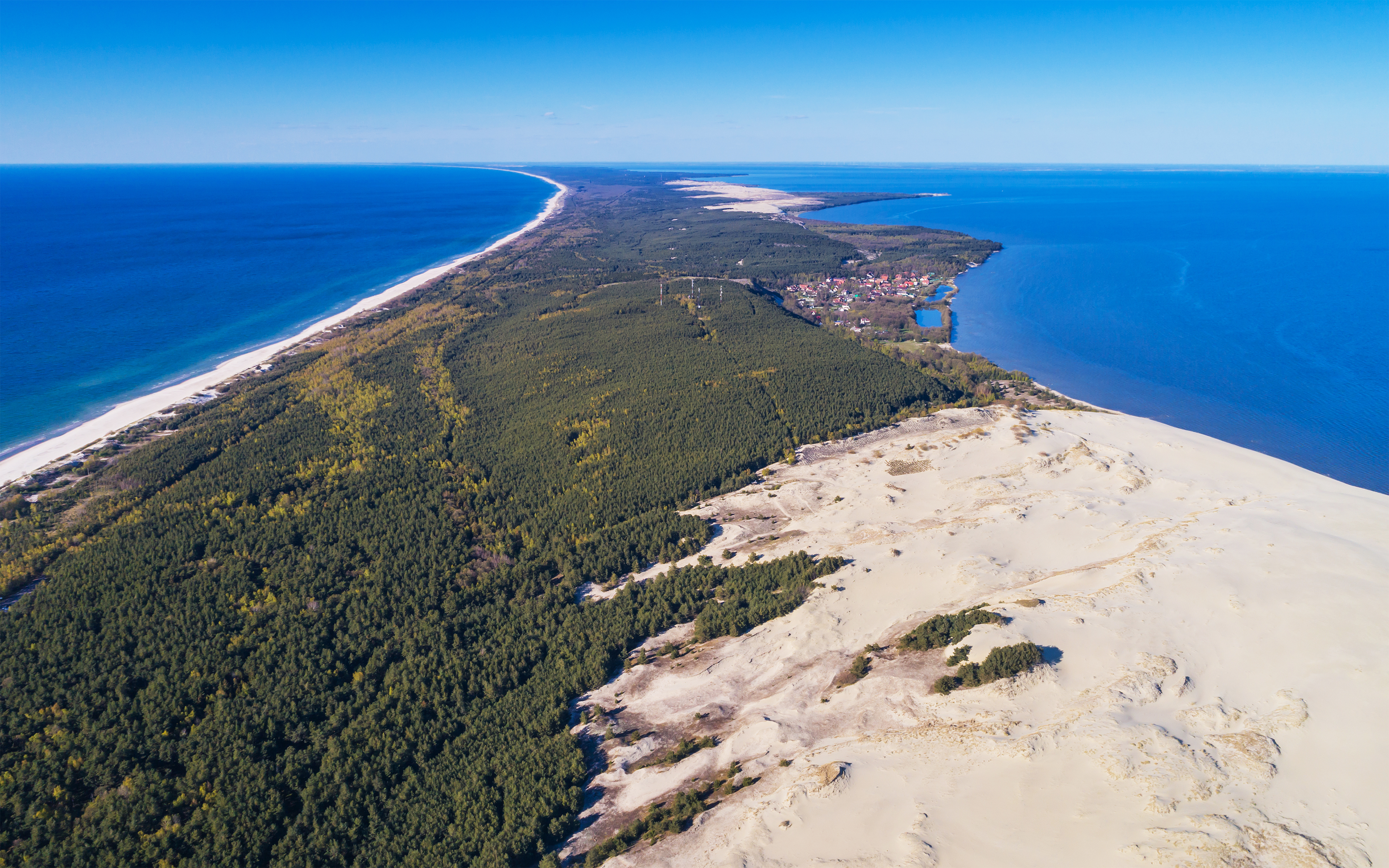
Aerial view of the Curonian Spit

The Malbork Castle in Poland and the Curonian Spit in Lithuania and Russia are designated World Heritage Sites. There are nine sites designated as Historic Monuments of Poland:

- Malbork Castle
- Kwidzyn Castle and Cathedral complex
- Archcathedral Basilica of the Assumption of the Blessed Virgin Mary and St. Andrew, Frombork
- Elbląg Canal
- Lidzbark Castle
- Olsztyn Castle
- Grunwald battlefield
- Święta Lipka Sanctuary
- Sanctuary of Saint Mary in Stoczek Klasztorny

== Bibliography ==
- Górski, Karol (1949). Związek Pruski i poddanie się Prus Polsce: zbiór tekstów źródłowych (in Polish and Latin). Poznań: Instytut Zachodni.
- Feuchtwanger, E. J. Prussia: Myth and Reality, The Role of Prussia in German History. Chicago: Henry Regnery Company, 1970
- Shennan, Margaret. The Rise of Brandenburg-Prussia. London: Routledge, 1995
