= Mokhovoye, Anninsky District, Voronezh Oblast =

Mokhovoye Моховое
- Selo
- Location within Voronezh Oblast Location within Russia
- Coordinates: 51°25′N 40°36′E
- Country: Russia
- Region: Voronezh Oblast
- District: Anninsky District
- Time zone: UTC+3:00

Mokhovoye (Russian: Моховое) is a rural locality (a selo) in Novokurlakskoye Rural Settlement, Anninsky District, Voronezh Oblast, Russia. The population was 357 as of 2010. There are 6 streets.

== Geography ==
Mokhovoye is located 20 km southeast of Anna (the district's administrative centre) by road. Stary Kurlak is the nearest rural locality.
