= Mokhovoye, Povorinsky District, Voronezh Oblast =

Mokhovoye Моховое
- Settlement
- Location within Voronezh Oblast Location within Russia
- Coordinates: 51°10′N 42°17′E
- Country: Russia
- Region: Voronezh Oblast
- District: Povorinsky District
- Time zone: UTC+3:00

Mokhovoye (Russian: Моховое) is a rural locality (a settlement) in Samodurvskoye Rural Settlement, Povorinsky District, Voronezh Oblast, Russia. The population was 97 as of 2010. There are 2 streets.

== Geography ==
Mokhovoye is located 6 km southeast of Povorino (the district's administrative centre) by road. Elevator is the nearest rural locality.
