= Mokhovaya, Perm Krai =

Mokhovaya Моховая
- Village
- Location within Perm Krai Location within Russia
- Coordinates: 56°52′N 54°29′E
- Country: Russia
- Region: Perm Krai
- District: Chaykovsky
- Time zone: UTC+5:00

Mokhovaya (Russian: Моховая) is a rural locality (a village) in Chaykovsky, Perm Krai, Russia. The population was 69 as of 2010. There are 3 streets.

== Geography ==
Mokhovaya is located 42 km northeast of Chaykovsky. Zasechny is the nearest rural locality.
