= Mokhovoye, Kursk Oblast =

Rural locality in Kursk Oblast, Russia

Mokhovoye Моховое
- Village
- Interactive map of Mokhovoye
- Location of Mokhovoye Mokhovoye (Kursk Oblast)
- Coordinates: 52°07′13″N 35°55′35″E
- Country: Russia
- Federal subject: Kursk Oblast
- Administrative district: Fatezhsky District
- SelsovietSelsoviet: Baninsky

Population (2010 Census)
  - Total: 22
  - Estimate (2010): 22 (0%)

Municipal status
  - Municipal district: Fatezhsky Municipal District
  - Rural settlement: Baninsky Selsoviet Rural Settlement
- Time zone: UTC+3 (MSK)
- Postal code: 307109
- Dialing code: +7 47144
- OKTMO ID: 38644402116
- Website: мобанинский.рф

Mokhovoye (Russian: Моховое) is a rural locality (Russian: деревня, lit. 'village') in Baninsky Selsoviet Rural Settlement, Fatezhsky District, Kursk Oblast, Russia. The population as of 2010 is 22.

== Geography ==
The village is located on the Gnilovodchik River (a link tributary of the Usozha in the basin of the Svapa) and its tributary, Mokhovoy Brook, 109 km from the Russia–Ukraine border, 46 km north-west of Kursk, 5 km north-east of the district center – the town Fatezh, 5 km from the selsoviet center – Chermoshnoy.

=== Climate ===
Mokhovoye has a warm-summer humid continental climate (Dfb in the Köppen climate classification).

== Transport ==
Mokhovoye is located 6 km from the federal route M-2 Crimea Highway as part of the European route E105, 5.5 km from the road of regional importance 38K-038 (Fatezh – Dmitriyev), 2 km from the road of intermunicipal significance 38H-233 (M2 "Crimea Highway" – 1st Banino), 25 km from the nearest railway station Vozy (railway line Oryol – Kursk).

The rural locality is situated 47 km from Kursk Vostochny Airport, 169 km from Belgorod International Airport and 229 km from Voronezh Peter the Great Airport.
