= Eldership of Draheim =

Starostwo of the Polish kingdom

Coordinates: 53.6019°N 16.1956°E

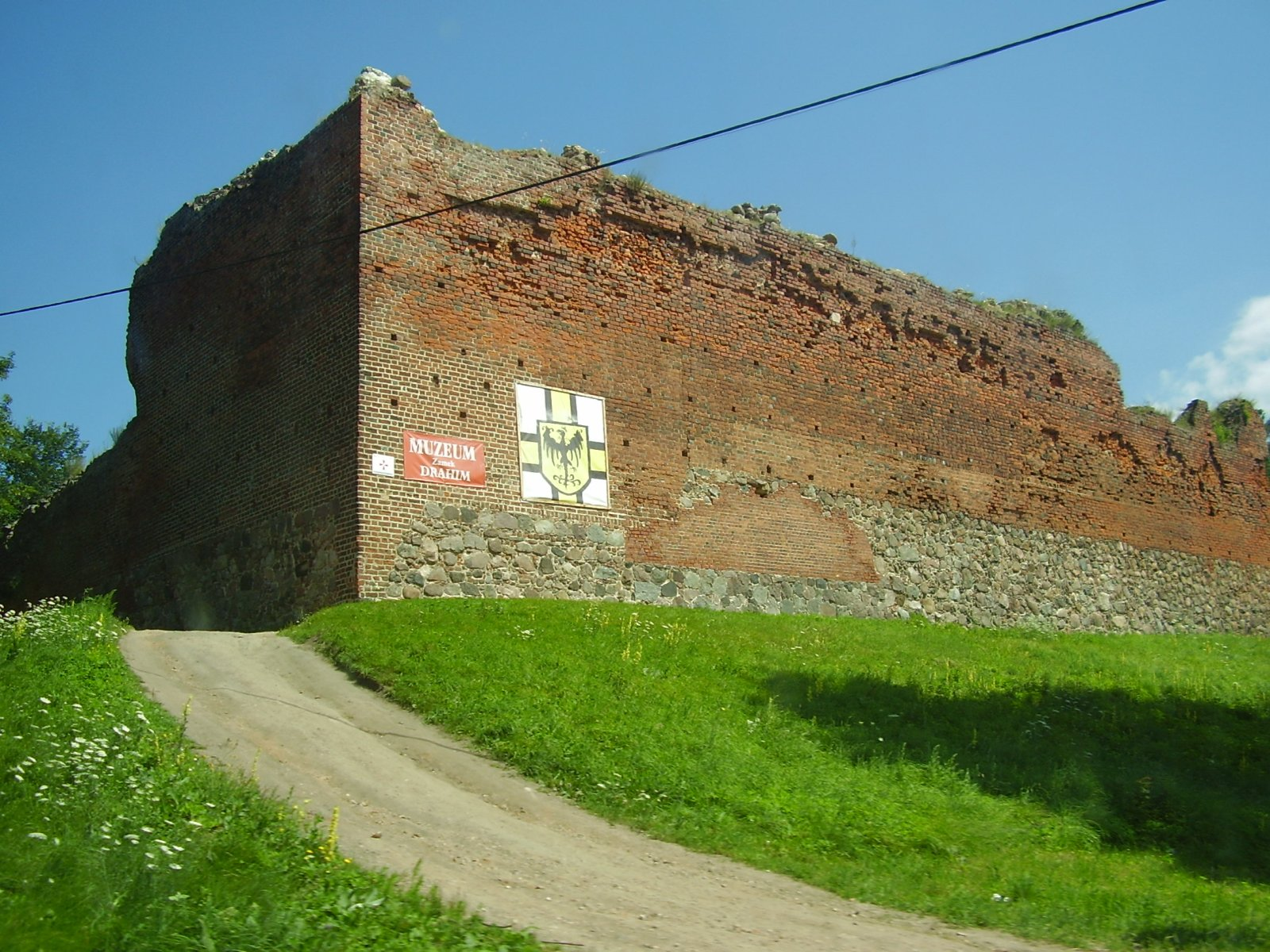
Drahim Castle

Eldership of Draheim or Drahim (Polish: starostwo drahimskie, German: Starostei Draheim) was a starostwo (crown territory) of the Polish kingdom from the 15th century, seated in Draheim. Pawned to Brandenburg-Prussia in 1657, it was directly incorporated into the Kingdom of Prussia in 1772 as Amt Draheim and the Town of Tempelburg.

== History ==
In the High Middle Ages, the region of the later starostwo was a borderland of the Piast Kingdom of Poland with Duchy of Pomerania and Margraviate of Brandenburg. In 1268, the largely unsettled area was given to the Knights Templar by the Polish duke Przemysł II. The order invited German settlers (Ostsiedlung). The German name Tempelburg for present-day Polish Czaplinek dates back to that era, and derives from the German name of the Knights Templar, Templer.

In 1312, the order was dissolved, and its possessions were taken over by the Knights Hospitaller. Draheim Castle (in the area of modern Stare Drawsko) was built in the mid-14th century at the crossing of the trade route via marchionis from Pomeranian Stargard to Danzig and the via regalis from Kolberg to Poznań. In 1368, during an exchange of territories, Margrave Otto VII of Brandenburg gave the areas around Czaplinek and Wałcz (Deutsch Krone) to the Polish king Casimir III the Great, who in 1370 established Wałcz County (powiat Wałcz) from these accessions: part of the Poznań Voivodeship (palatinate), it consisted of seven loosely connected regions in royal or noble possession subordinate to the judicum castrensis in Wałcz.

Draheim was made one of three (sub-)starosties of the county, the other ones being Usz-Pila (Schneidemühl) and Wałcz. In addition to the three starosties, four regions consisting of allodial possessions of the von Wedell, von der Goltz and Czarnowski families were also part of the county. These noble families were also in possession of areas in Pomerania, the Brandeburgian Neumark and other parts of Poland, and also of areas within the Draheim starosty. Draheim Castle was a royal possession. The starost of Draheim (also tenutarius or capitaneatus tenutae) was appointed for life by the Polish king, who owned a quarter of the starosty's income. The starost was in charge of the local administration, military and jurisdiction. His German subjects however, in contrast to peasants on Polish noble estates, were able to appeal his judicial decisions at the court in Wałcz, and were repeatedly assured this right in respective documents.

When in the late 14th century the southwestern territories of Heinrichsdorf-Warlange and Brotzen-Machlin became allodial possessions of the von der Goltz family, who before had held the areas as fiefs, and were thus excluded from the starosty, Draheim lost a direct land route to the rest of Walcz county. Draheim was then surrounded by the Imperial Duchy of Pomerania in the north, east and southeast, with the exception of the small enclave of Groß Poplow-Brutzen which was in the possession of the von Manteuffel family and directly under the Polish crown; in the southeast, Draheim bordered the Neumark exclave Groß Zacharin-Doderlage. The border was not fixed, but varied according to the ability of competing nobles in the frontier region to manifest their respective claims. When a noble perceived an intrusion into his territory, he and his subjects traditionally reacted with an inequatio, a mounted raid, into the territory of his competitor on the other side of the border. This practice persisted in Walcz county until the late 18th century.

In 1407, German and Polish nobility conquered the castle of Draheim (Stare Drawsko). These robber barons used the region as a base for raids until 1422, when they were defeated by the burghers of Dramburg (Drawsko Pomorskie). In 1438 the Teutonic Knights recognized Polish control of the region.

In the 16th century, the region largely converted to Lutheranism during the Protestant Reformation. During the Counter-Reformation, of the three important families only the von der Goltzs remained Protestant, while the von Wedells and Czarnowskis converted to Roman Catholicism, maintaining however a tolerant attitude towards the Protestant settlers. Starost Jan Czarnowski expelled the Protestant preachers in 1625; the churches were restored to Catholicism, although the populace remained largely Protestant.

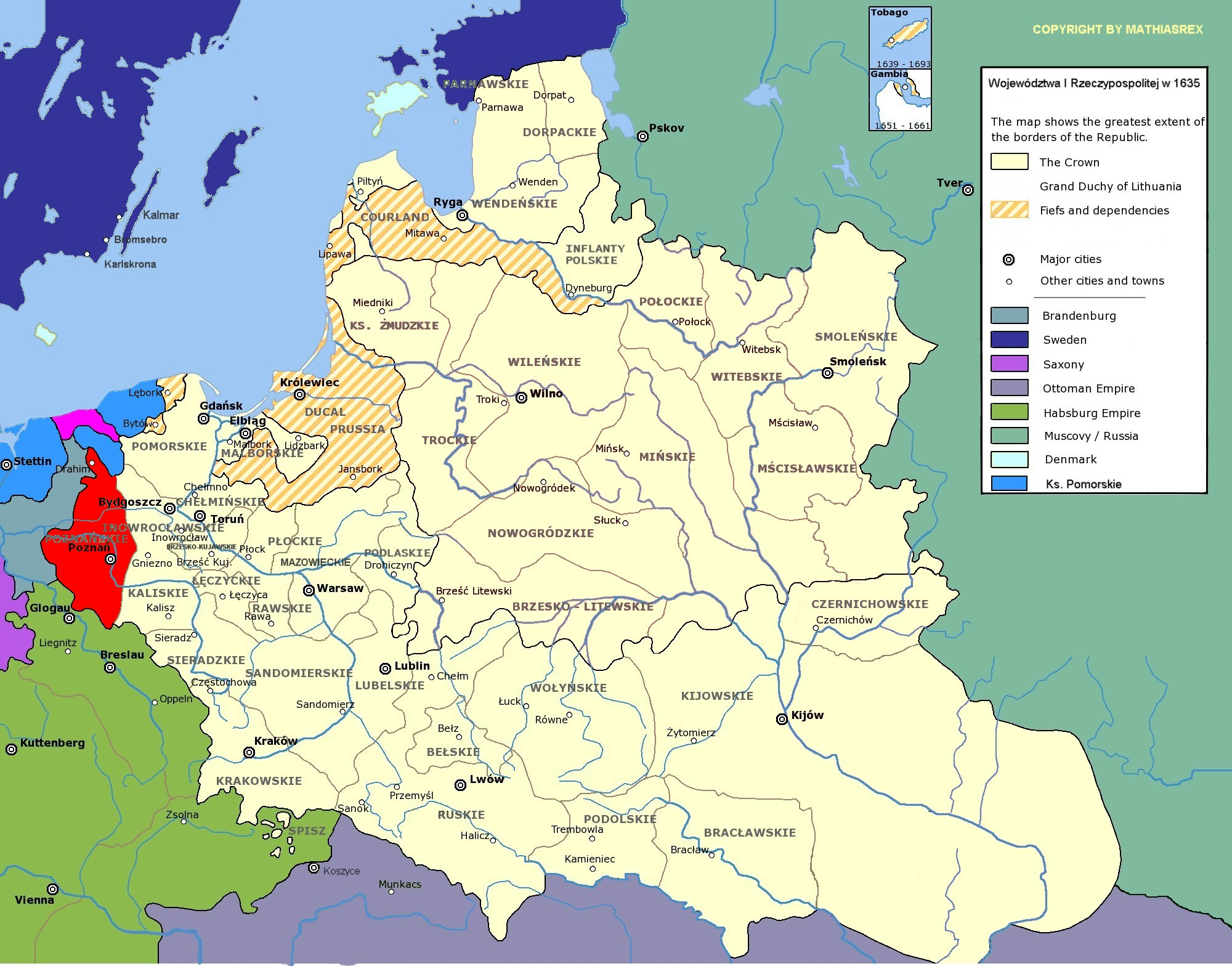
Draheim (Drahim) within the Poznań Voivodeship (in red), as of 1635

Also in the 16th century, conditions for peasants worsened in the neighboring Duchy of Pomerania due to the implementation of stringent serfdom. Many peasants fled from Pomerania to Draheim and other parts of Walcz county, where the nobles offered them hereditary farmland in deserted villages and clearances which they were to settle according to German law. The settlers primarily originated in Pomeranian and Neumark areas no more than 50 kilometres (31 mi) away from the Draheim border, and their influx continued throughout the 16th and 17th centuries despite protests of their former superiors. This migration was enhanced by the Thirty Years War, during which Pomerania and Neumark were devastated, while the Polish territories were spared. Orders of the Polish king to expel the refugees were ignored by the local nobles. New villages were founded according to Magdeburg law: their settlement was organized by a Schulze, usually a rich farmer or burgher, who bought the office from the landlord and worked out the contracts (Privilegien or Lehnsbrieffe [sic]) with the peasants. Schulzen, free peasants and pub owners were required to attend their landlord in arms when it came to the abovementioned border skirmishes with competing nobles. Since a Schulze was able to partition and sell his estate, with the heirs or other acquiring party gaining all privileges of a Schulze even if owning only part of such an estate, the number of Schulzen increased significantly over time. This process was enhanced by the landlords, who needed the armed services of the Schulzen at the border.

In July 1655, during the Second Northern War, Draheim was devastated by a trespassing Swedish army. A Brandenburgian report noted that no more than 150 inhabitants remained, the rest had fled to nearby areas, but hesitated to return as they were deprived of all their means.

Poland pawned Draheim to Brandenburg-Prussia in the 1657 Treaty of Bromberg. This arrangement was confirmed in the 1660 Treaty of Oliva, but Frederick William, Elector of Brandenburg, did not take control of the territory until 1668. Berlin subsequently administered the territory through the office of an Amtmann, who had his seat in Draheim Castle. It was later leased to domain tenants.

According to the Treaty of Bromberg, Frederick William promised not to infringe upon the rights of the Roman Catholic Church in Draheim. The number of Protestants in the territory gradually shrank. It was not until the reign of King Frederick William I of Prussia (1713–40) that a Protestant church was built in Tempelburg.

Draheim's role as a fief of Poland ended with the First Partition of Poland in 1772. In spite of being included as part of Kreis Neustettin, Regierungsbezirk Köslin within Province of Pomerania in 1817, the territory remained outside of the German Confederation and became part of Germany only upon formation of the North German Confederation in 1866. It also remained a part of the Roman Catholic Archdiocese of Poznań until becoming part of the newly established Apostolic Administration of Tütz.
