= Elbląg =

City in Warmian-Masurian Voivodeship, Poland

- City county
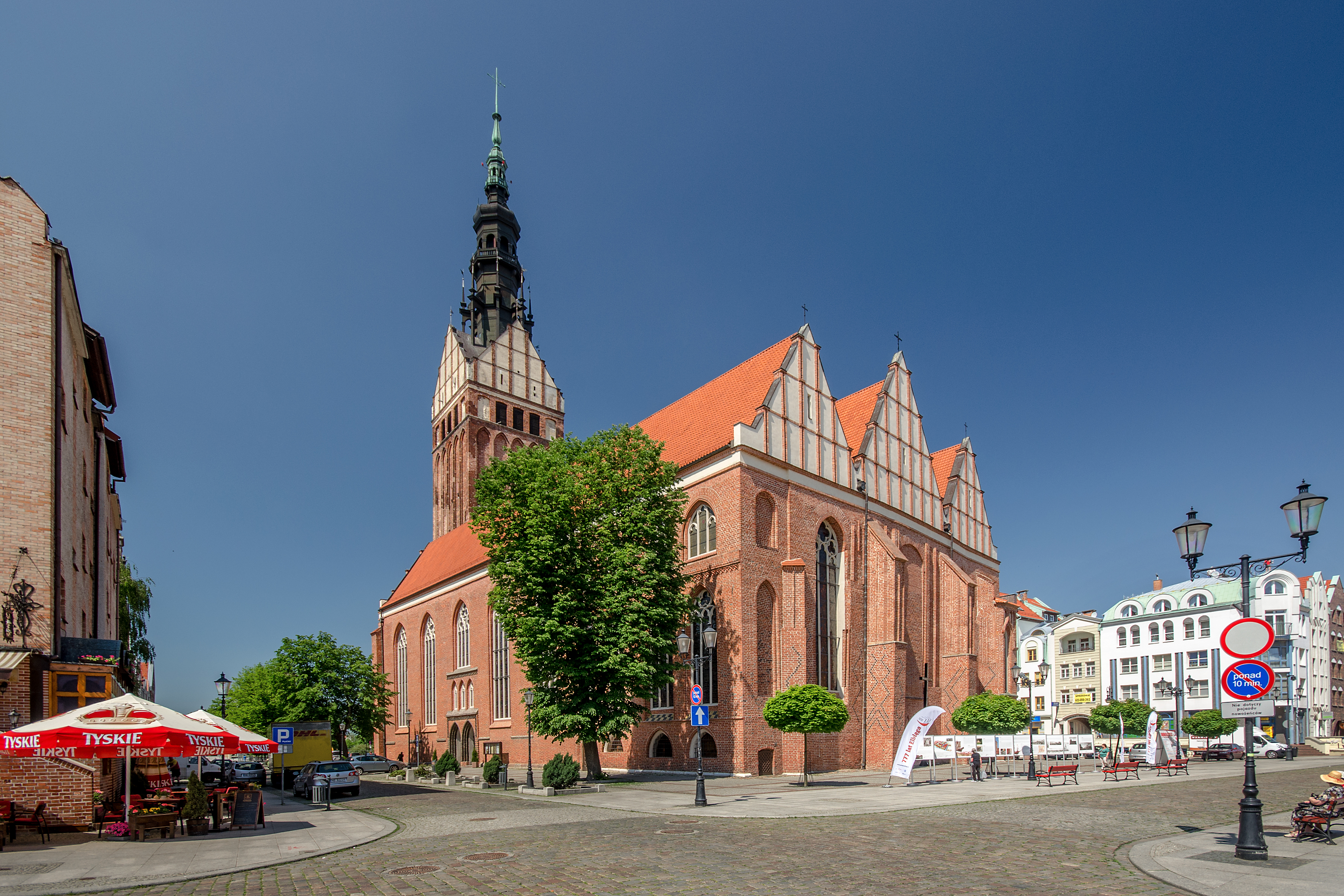
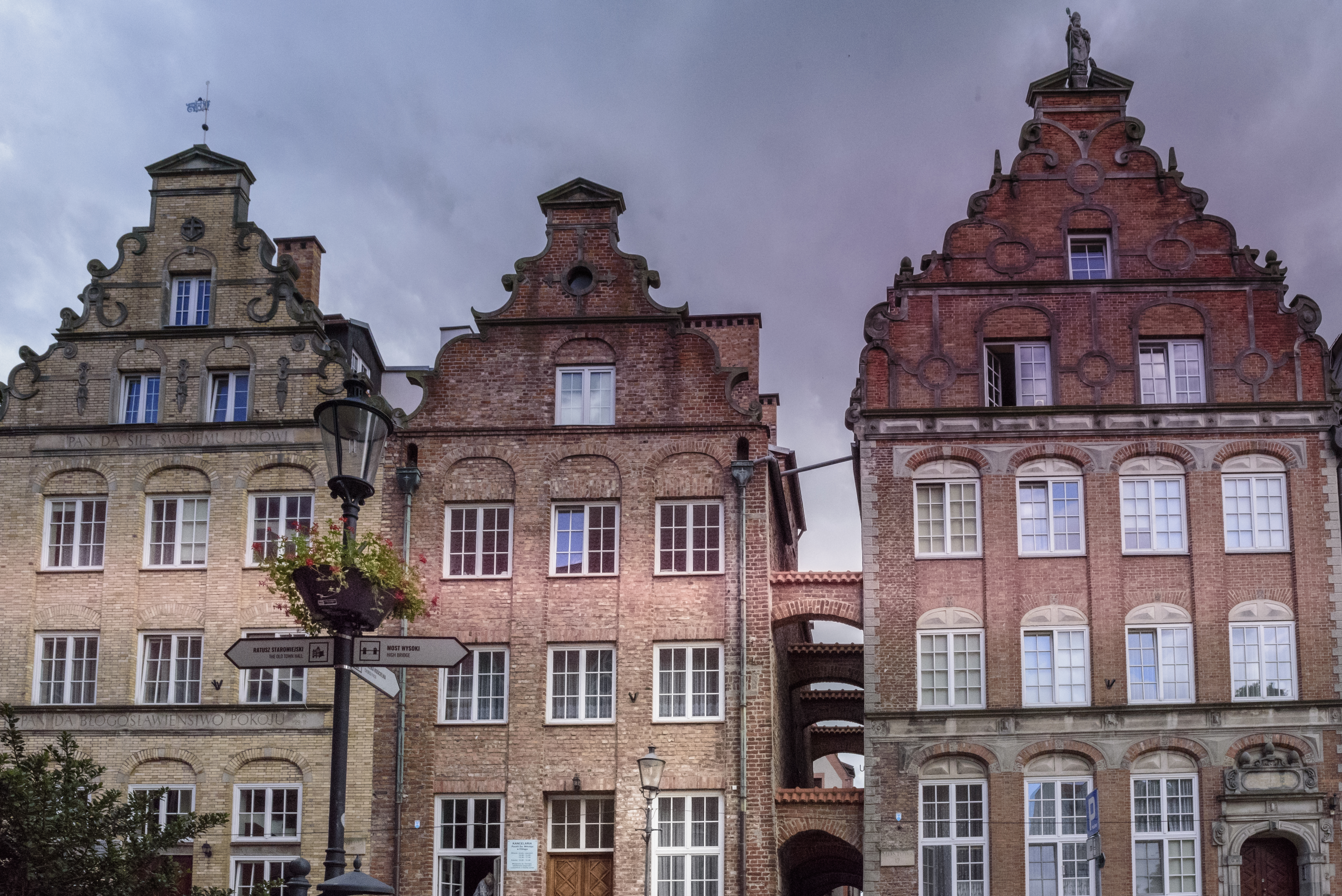
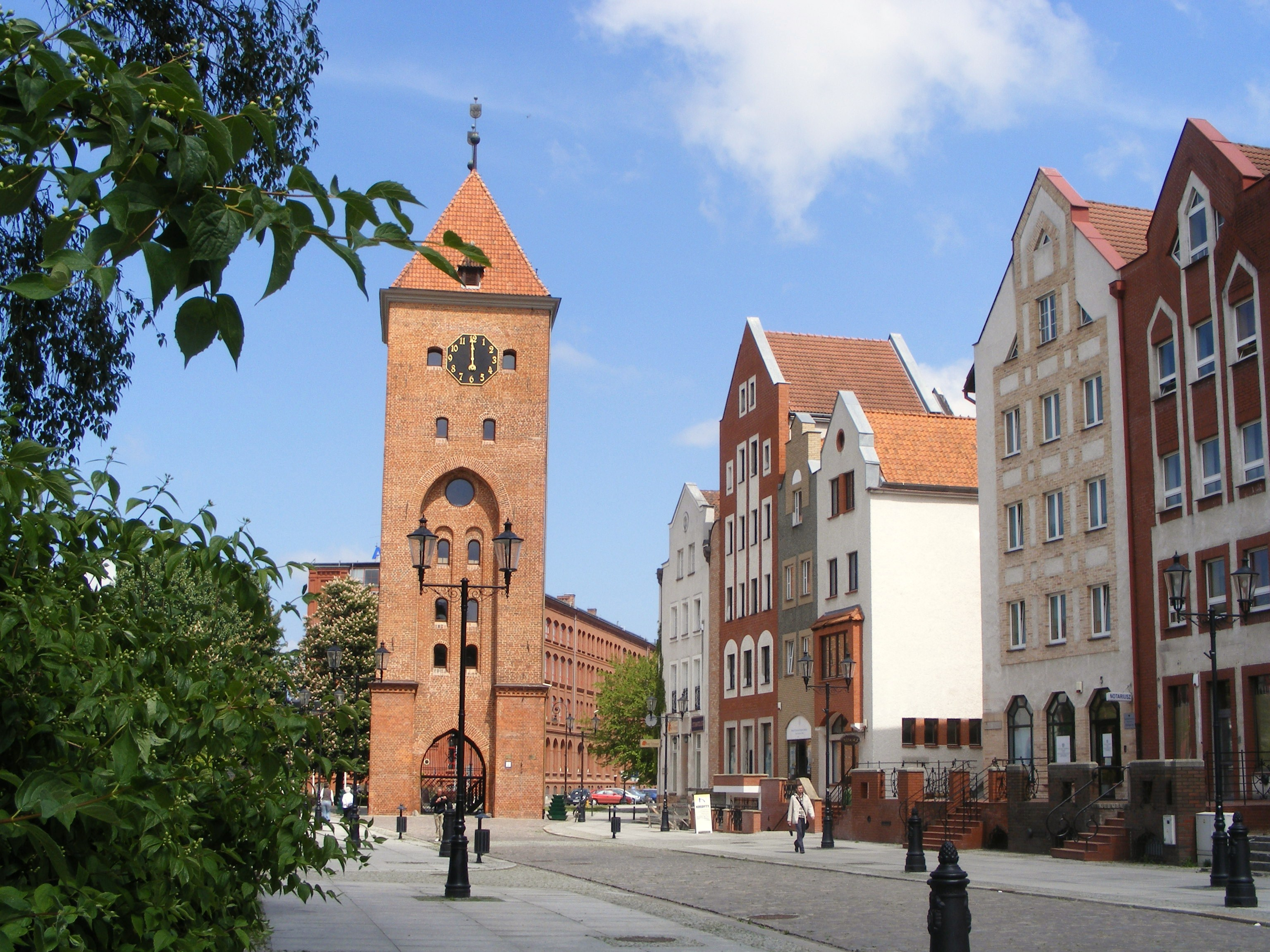
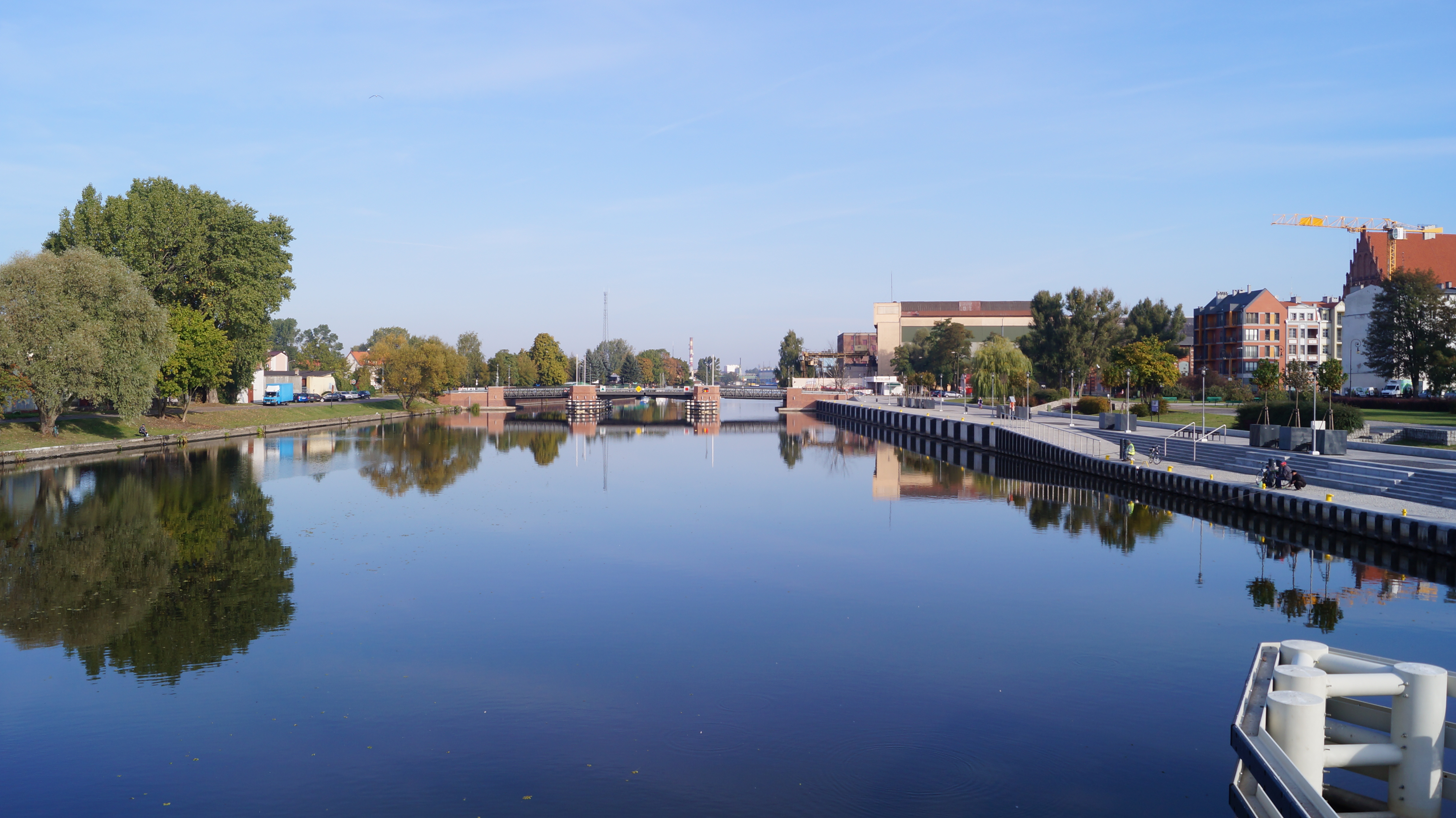
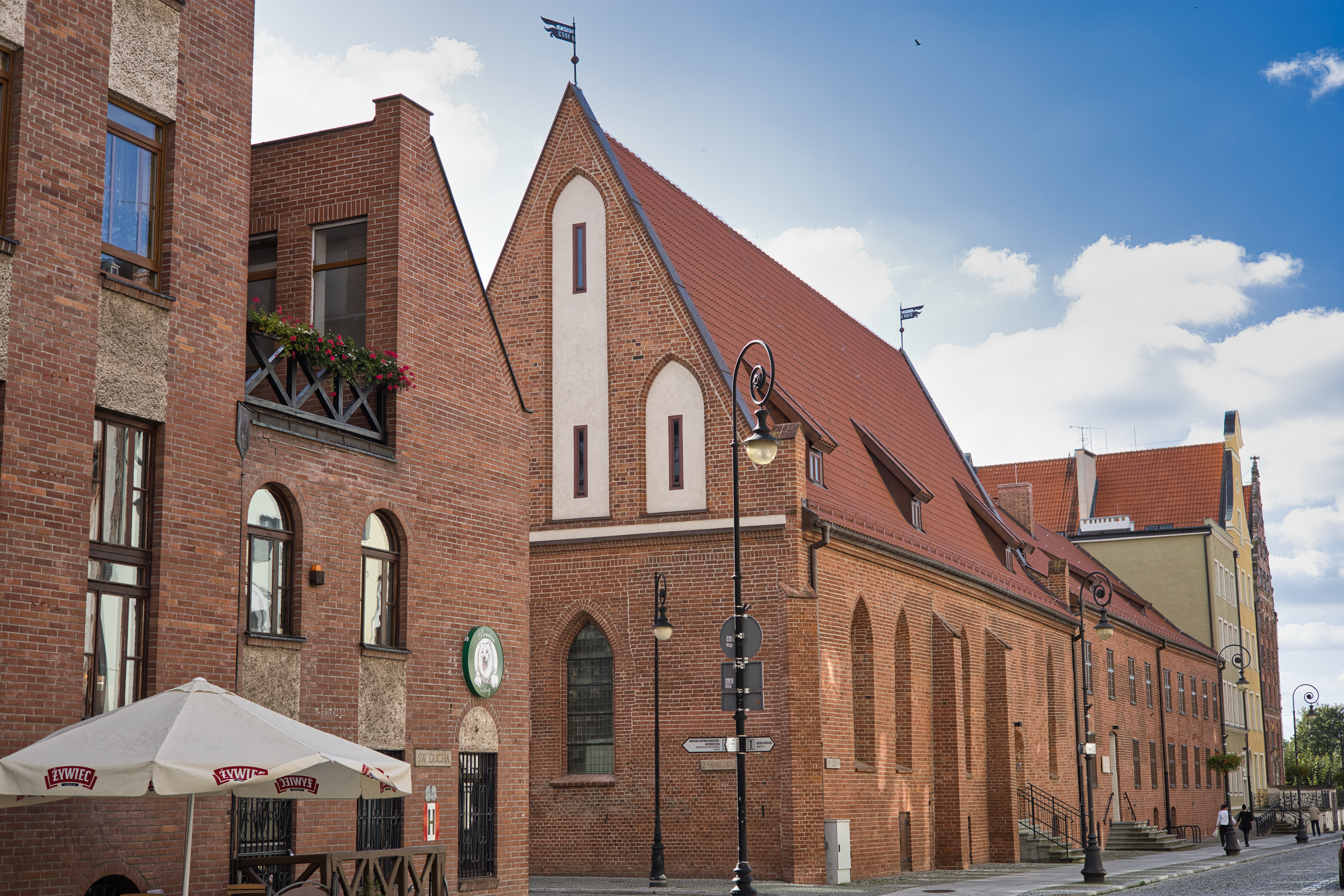
- St. Nicholas Cathedral Old Town Brama Targowa (Market Gate) Elbląg Canal Elbląska Library

- Flag Coat of arms

- Location within Poland
- Coordinates: 54°10′0″N 19°24′0″E
- Country: Poland
- Voivodeship: Warmian-Masurian
- County: City county
- Established: 1237
- City rights: 10 April 1246

Government
  - City mayor: Michał Missan (PO)

Area
  - Total: 79.82 km^{2} (30.82 sq mi)
  - Water: 102 ha (250 acres)
  - Urban: 1,975 ha (4,880 acres)

Population (31 December 2021)
  - Total: 127,390 ▲ (27th)
  - Density: 1,595/km^{2} (4,130/sq mi)
- Demonym(s): elblążanin (male) elblążanka (female) (pl)
- Time zone: UTC+1 (CET)
  - Summer (DST): UTC+2 (CEST)
- Postal code: 82-300 to 82-315
- Area code: +48 55
- Geocode: 54.17216,19.41865
- Car plates: NE
- Climate: Cfb
- Website: elblag.eu

Elbląg (Polish: [ˈɛlblɔŋk]; German: Elbing [ˈɛlbɪŋ]) is a city in the Warmian-Masurian Voivodeship, in northern Poland, located in the eastern edge of the Żuławy region with 127,390 inhabitants, as of December 2021. It is the capital of Elbląg County.

Elbląg is one of the oldest cities in the province, founded in 1237. As a member of the Hanseatic League, the city was linked to other major ports of northern and central Europe. Elbląg joined Poland in 1454, and then was one of the country's chief ports, and a major port for English–Polish trade, until the First Partition of Poland in 1772, when it was annexed by Prussia. Its trading role greatly weakened, until the era of industrialization in the 19th century. It was then that the famous Elbląg Canal was commissioned. A tourist site and important engineering monument, it has been named one of the Seven Wonders of Poland and a Historic Monument of Poland. During World War II, it suffered severe destruction of the Old Town district, and after the war it became again part of Poland.

Today, Elbląg has over 120,000 inhabitants and is a "vibrant city with an attractive tourist base". It serves as an academic and financial center and among its numerous historic monuments is the Market Gate from 1309 and St. Nicholas Cathedral. Elbląg is also known for its archaeological sites, museums and the country's largest brewery, founded in 1872.

== Etymology ==
Elbląg derives from the earlier German-language Elbing, which is the name by which the Teutonic Knights knew both the river here and the citadel they established on its banks in 1237. The purpose of the citadel was to prevent the Old Prussian settlement of Truso from being reoccupied, the German crusaders being at war with the pagan Prussians. The citadel was named after the river, itself of uncertain etymology. One traditional etymology connects it to the name of the Helveconae, a Germanic tribe mentioned in Ancient Greek and Latin sources, but the etymology or language of the tribal name remains unknown. The oldest known mention of the river or town Elbląg is in the form Ylfing in the report of a sailor Wulfstan from the end of the 9th century, in The Voyages of Ohthere and Wulfstan which was written in Anglo-Saxon in King Alfred's reign.

== Modern city ==
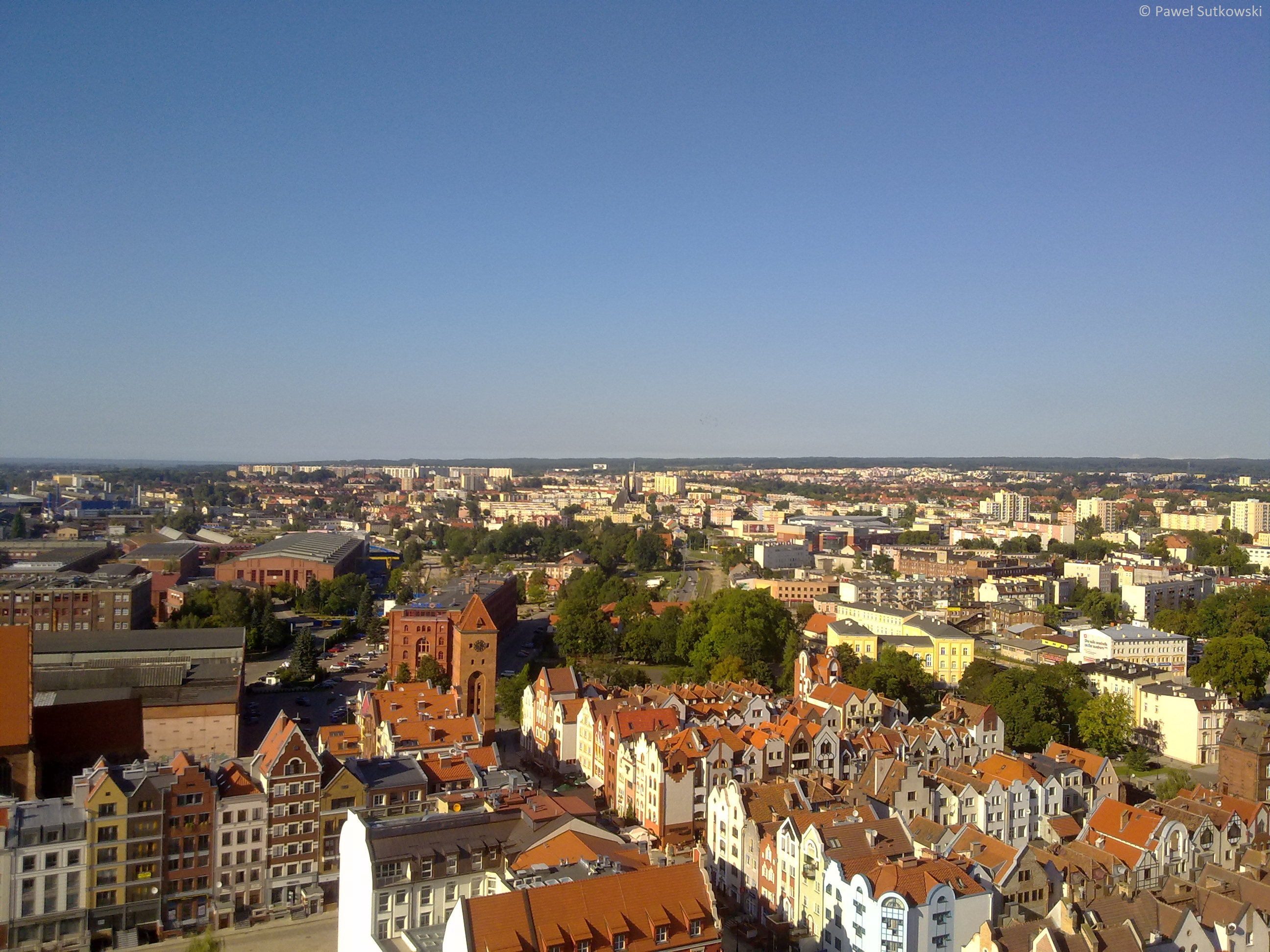
Aerial view of the Old Town

The city was almost completely destroyed at the end of World War II. Parts of the inner city were gradually rebuilt, and around 2000 rebuilding was begun in a style emulating the previous architecture, in many cases over the same foundations and utilizing old bricks and portions of the same walls. The western suburbs of the old city have not been reconstructed.

The modern city adjoins about half the length of the river between Lake Drużno and Elbląg Bay (Zatoka Elbląska, an arm of the Vistula Lagoon), and spreads out on both banks, though mainly on the eastern side. To the east is the Elbląg Upland (Wysoczyzna Elbląska), a dome pushed up by glacial compression, 390 km^{2} (150 sq mi) in diameter and 200 m (656.17 ft) high at its greatest elevation.

Views to the west show flat fields extending to the horizon; this part of the Vistula Delta (Żuławy Wiślane) is used mainly for agricultural purposes. To the south are the marshes and swamps of Drużno. The Elbląg River has been left in a more natural state through the city, but elsewhere it is a controlled channel with branches. One of them, the Jagiellonski Channel (Kanał Jagielloński), leads to the Nogat River, along which navigation to Gdańsk is common. The Elbląg Canal (Kanał Elbląski) connecting Lake Drużno with Drwęca River and Lake Jeziorak is a tourist site.

== Port of Elbląg ==
Elbląg is not a deep-water port. The draft of vessels using its waterways must be no greater than 1.5 m (4 ft 11.06 in) by law. The turning area at Elbląg is 120 m (393.70 ft) diameter and a pilot is required for large vessels. Deep water vessels cannot manoeuvre; in that sense, Elbląg has become a subsidiary port of Gdańsk. Traffic of smaller vessels at Elbląg is within the river and very marginal, while larger vessels were unable to reach the open Baltic Sea after 1945 without crossing into Russian territory. Construction of the Vistula Spit canal was completed in September 2022, allowing vessels access to the Baltic Sea while remaining within Polish territory. The city features three quay complexes, movable cranes, and railways.

== Geography ==
=== Geographical location ===
Elbląg is located about 55 km (34 mi) south-east of Gdańsk and 90 km (56 mi) south-west of Kaliningrad, Russia. The city is a port on the river Elbląg, which flows into the Vistula Lagoon about 10 km (6 mi) to the north, thus giving the city access to the Baltic Sea via the Russian-controlled Strait of Baltiysk. The Old Town (Polish: Stare Miasto) is located on the river Elbląg connecting Lake Drużno to the Vistula Lagoon, about 10 km (6 mi) from the lagoon and 60 km (37 mi) from Gdańsk.

=== Climate ===
The climate of Elbląg is an oceanic climate (Köppen Cfb) closely bordering on a humid continental climate (Köppen Dfb), owing to its position of the Baltic Sea, which moderates the temperatures, compared to the interior of Poland. The climate is cool throughout the year and there is a somewhat uniform precipitation throughout the year. Typical of Northern Europe, there is little sunshine during the year.

Climate data for Elbląg (1991–2020 normals, extremes 1951–present)
Month	Jan	Feb	Mar	Apr	May	Jun	Jul	Aug	Sep	Oct	Nov	Dec	Year
Record high °C (°F)	13.3 (55.9)	17.7 (63.9)	22.4 (72.3)	29.0 (84.2)	32.0 (89.6)	33.1 (91.6)	36.5 (97.7)	35.7 (96.3)	30.6 (87.1)	26.5 (79.7)	18.1 (64.6)	13.0 (55.4)	36.5 (97.7)
Mean maximum °C (°F)	7.3 (45.1)	8.4 (47.1)	15.0 (59.0)	22.7 (72.9)	26.2 (79.2)	29.1 (84.4)	30.3 (86.5)	30.4 (86.7)	25.3 (77.5)	19.2 (66.6)	12.3 (54.1)	8.5 (47.3)	32.0 (89.6)
Mean daily maximum °C (°F)	0.9 (33.6)	2.2 (36.0)	6.3 (43.3)	12.9 (55.2)	17.8 (64.0)	20.8 (69.4)	22.9 (73.2)	23.0 (73.4)	18.1 (64.6)	12.1 (53.8)	6.0 (42.8)	2.2 (36.0)	12.1 (53.8)
Daily mean °C (°F)	−1.4 (29.5)	−0.5 (31.1)	2.7 (36.9)	8.2 (46.8)	12.7 (54.9)	15.9 (60.6)	18.2 (64.8)	18.0 (64.4)	13.7 (56.7)	8.6 (47.5)	3.8 (38.8)	0.2 (32.4)	8.3 (46.9)
Mean daily minimum °C (°F)	−3.6 (25.5)	−3.0 (26.6)	−0.5 (31.1)	3.9 (39.0)	8.1 (46.6)	11.4 (52.5)	13.9 (57.0)	13.8 (56.8)	10.0 (50.0)	5.6 (42.1)	1.7 (35.1)	−1.9 (28.6)	4.9 (40.8)
Mean minimum °C (°F)	−14.9 (5.2)	−12.7 (9.1)	−7.4 (18.7)	−2.8 (27.0)	0.8 (33.4)	5.2 (41.4)	8.6 (47.5)	8.1 (46.6)	3.6 (38.5)	−1.2 (29.8)	−5.4 (22.3)	−10.8 (12.6)	−17.7 (0.1)
Record low °C (°F)	−30.1 (−22.2)	−30.0 (−22.0)	−21.6 (−6.9)	−6.2 (20.8)	−3.5 (25.7)	−0.2 (31.6)	4.4 (39.9)	3.4 (38.1)	−1.7 (28.9)	−8.5 (16.7)	−16.9 (1.6)	−22.2 (−8.0)	−30.1 (−22.2)
Average precipitation mm (inches)	47.4 (1.87)	37.7 (1.48)	40.8 (1.61)	37.0 (1.46)	58.6 (2.31)	70.2 (2.76)	87.1 (3.43)	77.9 (3.07)	73.9 (2.91)	70.3 (2.77)	57.8 (2.28)	56.4 (2.22)	715.0 (28.15)
Average precipitation days (≥ 0.1 mm)	18.8	15.5	15.0	12.0	13.3	14.3	14.6	14.5	13.6	16.5	17.0	19.1	184.1
Average relative humidity (%)	87.5	84.2	77.8	70.2	71.7	74.8	76.6	76.1	80.4	84.5	89.4	89.7	80.3
Average dew point °C (°F)	−2 (28)	−2 (28)	0 (32)	3 (37)	8 (46)	12 (54)	15 (59)	15 (59)	12 (54)	7 (45)	4 (39)	1 (34)	6 (43)
Mean monthly sunshine hours	40.4	67.0	128.6	199.8	257.0	243.5	246.7	237.5	164.8	104.4	44.0	29.5	1,767.3
Source 1: Meteomodel.pl
Source 2: Time and Date (dewpoints, 2005-2015)

== History ==
=== Truso ===
Historical affiliations

Teutonic Order 1246–1454
Kingdom of Poland 1454–1569
Polish–Lithuanian Commonwealth 1569–1772
Kingdom of Prussia 1772–1871
German Empire 1871–1918
Weimar Germany 1918–1933
Nazi Germany 1933–1945
People's Republic of Poland 1945–1989
Republic of Poland 1989–present

The settlement was first mentioned as "Ilfing" in The Voyages of Ohthere and Wulfstan, an Anglo-Saxon chronicle written in King Alfred's reign using information from a Viking who had visited the area.

During the Middle Ages, the Viking settlement of Truso was located on Lake Drużno, near the current site of Elbląg in historical Pogesania; the settlement burned down in the 10th century. Early in the 13th century the Teutonic Knights conquered the region, built a castle, and founded Elbing on the lake, with a population mostly from Lübeck (today the lake, now much smaller, no longer reaches the city). After the uprising against the Teutonic Knights and the destruction of the castle by the inhabitants, the city successively came under the sovereignty of the Kingdom of Poland (1454), the Kingdom of Prussia (1772), and Germany (1871). Elbing was heavily damaged in World War II, and its remaining German citizens were expelled upon the war's end in accordance with the Potsdam Agreement. The city became again part of Poland in 1945 and was repopulated with Polish citizens.

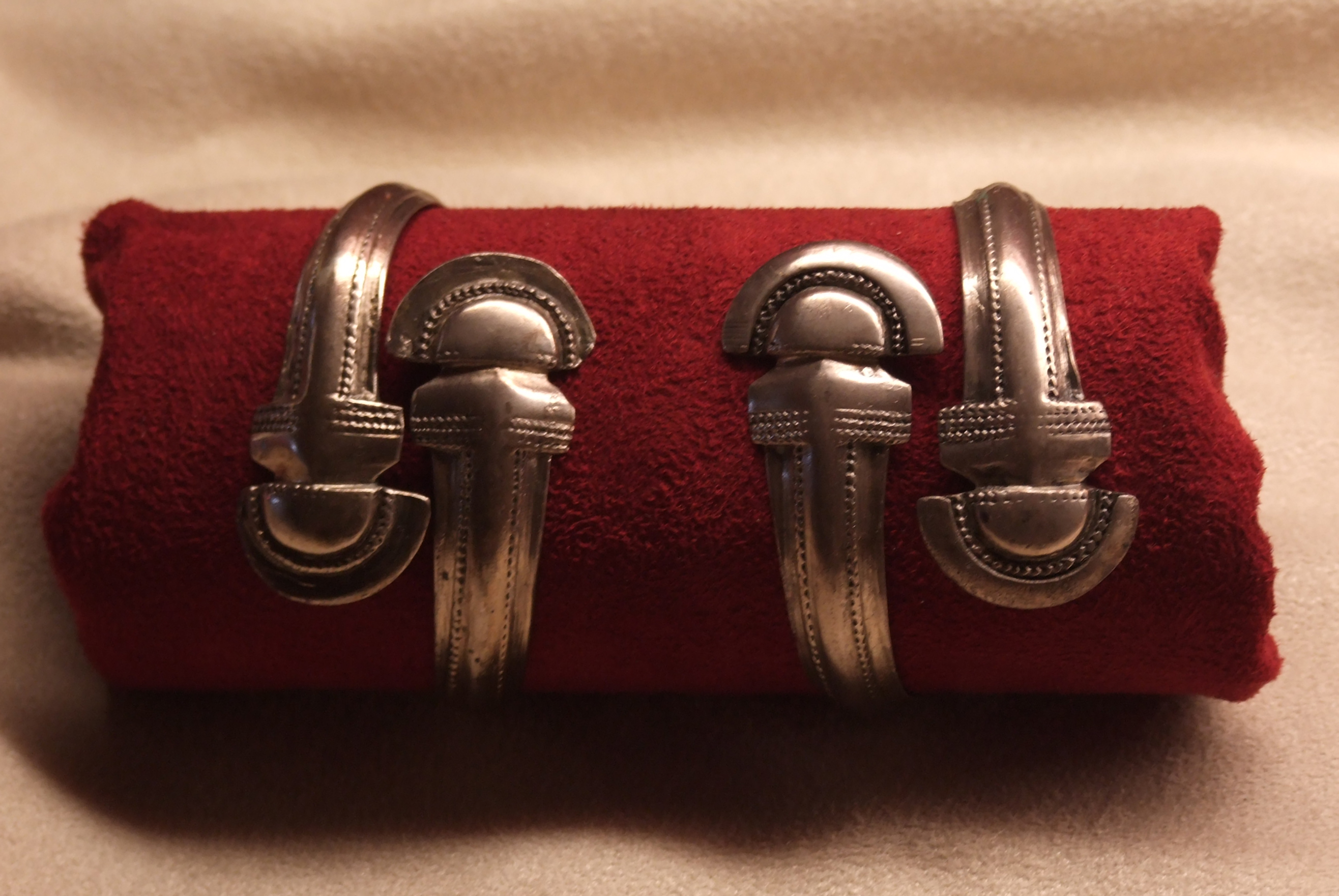
Early-3rd-century silver bracelet in the Archaeological and Historical Museum in Elbląg

The seaport of Truso was first mentioned c. 890 by Wulfstan of Hedeby, an Anglo-Saxon sailor, travelling on the south coast of the Baltic Sea at the behest of King Alfred the Great of England. The exact location of Truso was not known for a long time, as the seashore has significantly changed, but most historians trace the settlement inside or near to modern Elbląg on Lake Drużno. Truso was located at territory already known to the Roman Empire and earlier.

It was an important seaport serving the Vistula River bay on the early medieval Baltic Sea trade routes which led from Birka in the north to the island of Gotland and to Visby in the Baltic Sea. From there, traders continued further south to Carnuntum along the Amber Road. The ancient Amber Road led further southwest and southeast to the Black Sea and eventually to Asia. The east–west trade route went from Truso, along the Baltic Sea to Jutland, and from there inland by river to Hedeby, a large trading center in Jutland. The main goods of Truso were amber, furs, and slaves.

Archaeological finds in 1897 and diggings in the 1920s placed Truso at Gut Hansdorf. A large burial field was also found at Elbląg. Recent Polish diggings have found burned beams and ashes and thousand-year-old artifacts in an area of about 20 hectares. Many of these artifacts are now displayed at the Muzeum w Elblągu.

=== Prussian Crusade ===
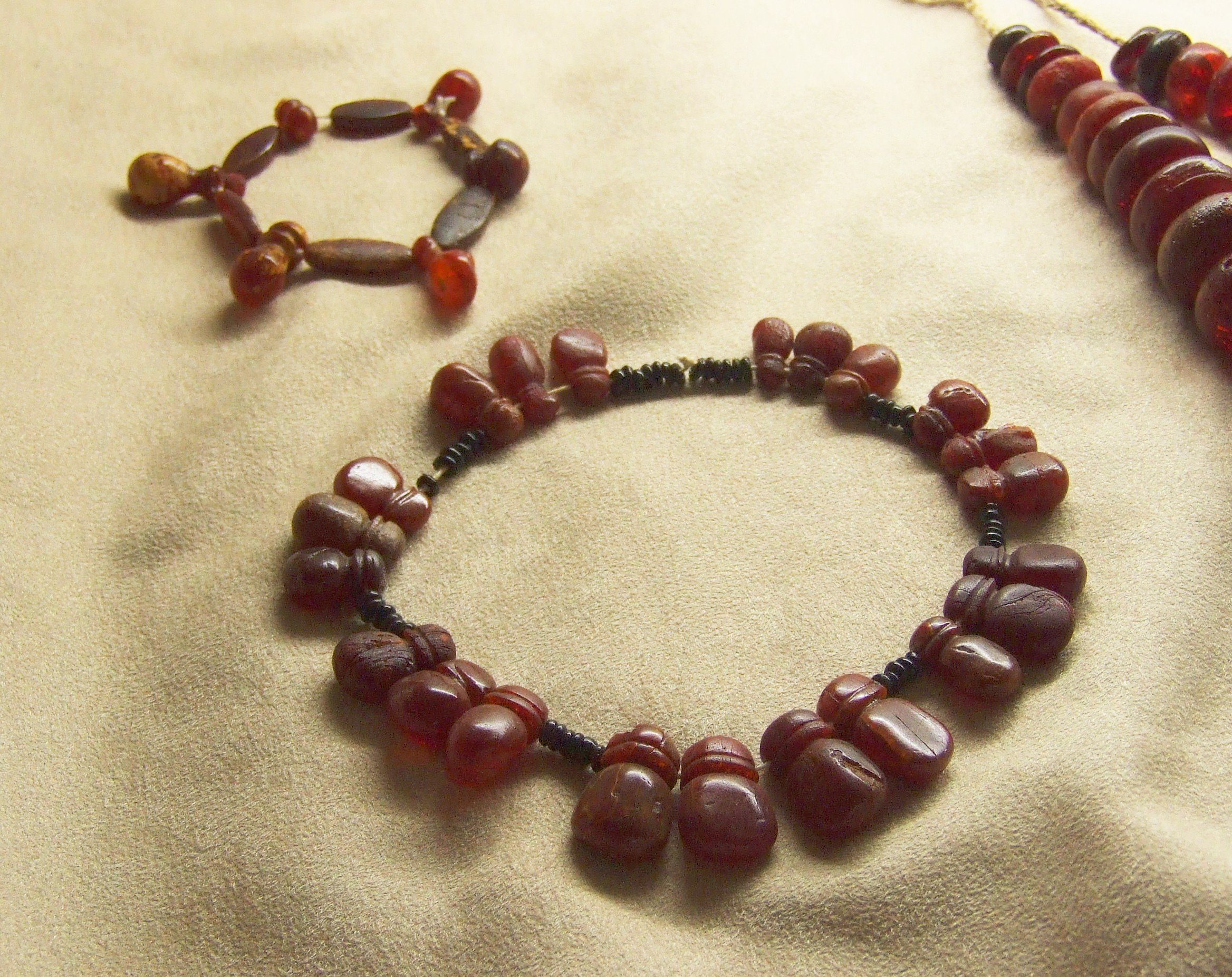
Ancient amber necklaces in the Archaeological and Historical Museum in Elbląg

Attempts to conquer Prussian land began in 997, when Bolesław I the Brave, at the urging of the Pope, sent a contingent of soldiers and a missionary (Adalbert of Prague) to the pagan Prussians, a non-Slavic people, on a crusade of conquest and conversion. The crusade encompassed much of the Baltic Sea coast east of the Polish city of Gdańsk, up to Sambia. Starting in 1209 additional crusades were called for by Konrad of Masovia, who mainly sought to conquer Prussian territory, rather than actually convert the indigenous Prussians. Despite heroic efforts, Old Prussian sovereignty would eventually collapse after a succession of wars instigated by Pope Honorius III and his frequent calls for crusade.

Before the Prussians were finally brought to heel, Polish rulers and the Duchy of Masovia, both by then Christianised peoples, would be continually frustrated in their attempts at northern expansion. Aside from minor border raids, major campaigns against the Prussians would be launched in 1219, 1220, and 1222. After a particularly sound defeat by Prussian forces in 1223, Polish forces in Chełmno, the seat of Christian of Oliva and the Duchy of Masovia, were forced onto the defensive.

In 1226 Duke Konrad I of Masovia summoned the Teutonic Knights for assistance; by 1230 they had secured Chełmno (Culm) and begun claiming conquered territories for themselves under the authority of the Holy Roman Empire, although these claims were rejected by the Poles, whose ambition had been to conquer Prussia all along. The Teutonic Order's strategy was to move down the Vistula and secure the delta, establishing a barrier between the Prussians and Gdańsk. The victorious Teutonic Knights built a castle at Elbing.

The Chronicon terrae Prussiae describes the conflict in the vicinity of Lake Drużno shortly before the founding of Elbing:

Omnia propugnacula, que habebant in illo loco, qui dicitur (list) ... circa stagnum Drusine ... occisis et captiis infidelibus, potenter expugnavit, et in cinerem redigendo terre alteri coequavit.

"All the little redoubts that they had in that place, which are said to be (list) ... and around the Drusine marsh ... he (frater Hermannus magister) assaulted and levelled by rendering them into ash, after the infidels had been killed or captured."

Truso did not disappear suddenly to be replaced with the citadel and town of Elbing during the Prussian Crusade. It had already burned down in the tenth century, with the population dispersed in the area.

=== Teutonic Order ===
The Chronicon terrae Prussiae describes the founding of Elbing under the leadership of Hermann Balk. After building two ships, the Pilgerim (Pilgrim) and the Vridelant (Friedland), with the assistance of Margrave Henry III of Margraviate of Meissen, the Teutonic Knights used them to clear the Vistula Lagoon (Frisches Haff) and the Vistula Spit of Prussians:

... et recens mare purgatum fuit ab insultu infidelium ...
... "and the Vistula Spit was purged of the insult of the infidels..."

Apparently the river was in Pomesania, which the knights had just finished clearing, but the bay was in Pogesania. The first Elbing was placed in Pogesania:

Magister ... venit ad terram Pogesanie, ad insulam illam ... que est in media fluminis Elbingi, in illo loco, ubi Elbingus intrat recens mare et erexit ibi castrum, quod a nomine fluminis Elbingum appellavit, anno dominice incarnacionis MCCXXXVII. Aliqui referunt, quod idem castrum postea ab infidelibus fuerit expugnatum, et tunc ad eum locum, ubi nunc situm est, translatum, et circa ipsum civitas collocata.

"The master ... came to the region of Pogesania, to that island which is in the middle of the Elbing river, in that place where the Elbing enters the Vistula Lagoon, and built there a fort, which he called by the name of the Elbing River, in the year of the incarnation of the Lord, 1237. Others report that the same fort was attacked by the infidels and then was moved to the place where it is now situated, and the city gathered around it."

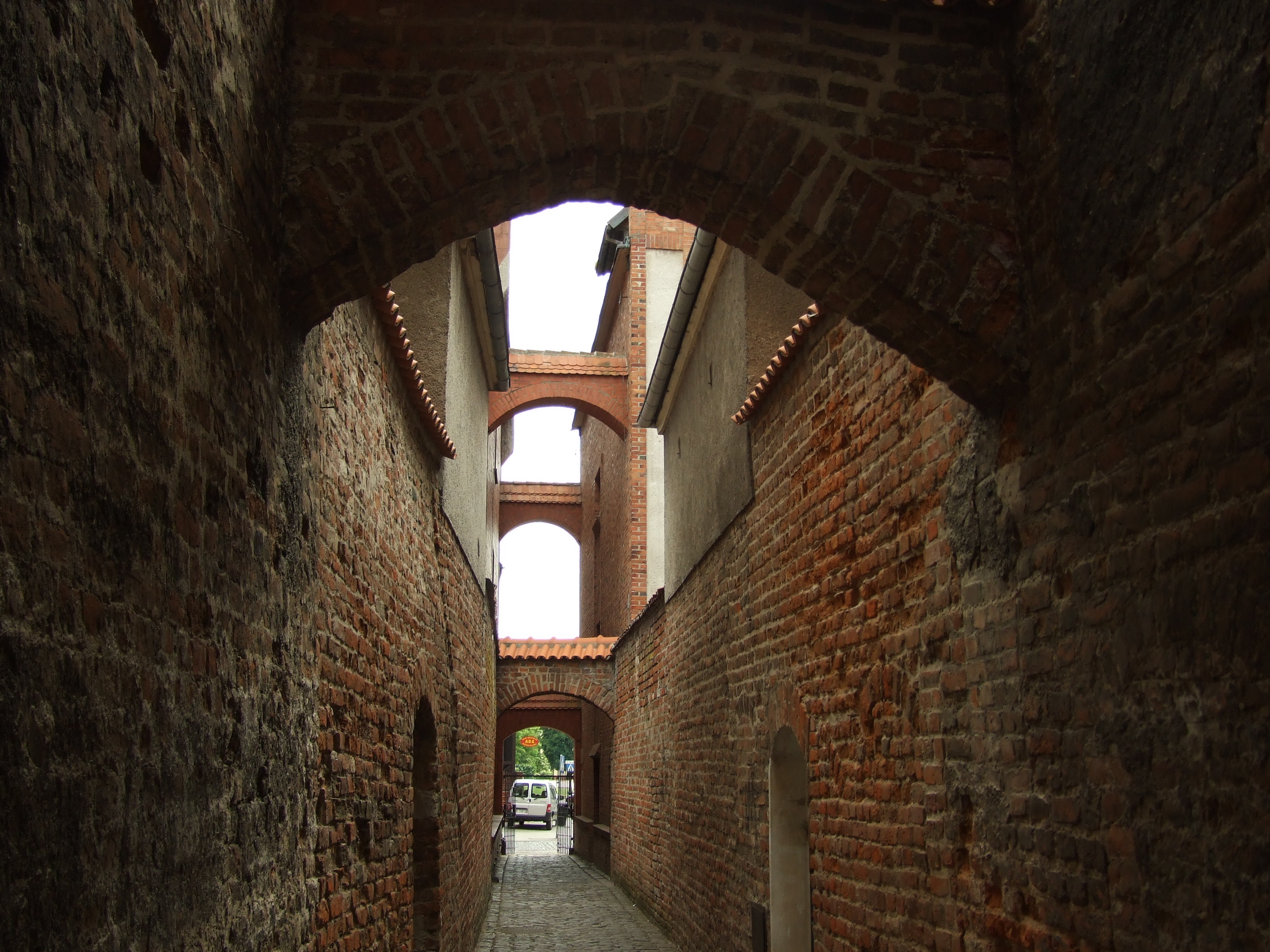
Medieval Church Path between tenements connecting the churches of the Old Town

Both landings were amphibious operations conducted from the ships. The Chronicon relates that they were in use for many years and then were sunk in Lake Drużno. In 1238 the Dominican Order was invited to build a monastery on a grant of land. Pomesania was not secured, however, and from 1240 to 1242 the order began building a brick castle on the south side of the settlement. It may be significant that Elbing's first industry was the same as Truso's had been: manufacture of amber and bone artifacts for export. In 1243 William of Modena created the Diocese of Pomesania and three others. They were at first only ideological constructs, but the tides of time turned them into reality in that same century.

The foundation of Elbing was perhaps not the end of the Old Prussian story in the region. In 1825 a manuscript listing a vocabulary of the Baltic Old Prussian language, commonly known in English as Elbing Vocabulary, was found among some manuscripts from a merchant's house. It contained 802 words in a dialect now termed Pomesanian with their equivalents in an early form of High German.

The origin of the vocabulary remains unknown. Its format is like that of modern travel dictionaries; i.e., it may have been used by German speakers to communicate with Old Prussians, but the specific circumstances are only speculative. The manuscript became the Codex Neumannianus. It disappeared after a British bombing raid destroyed the library at Elbing but before then facsimiles had been made. The date of the MSS was estimated at ca. 1400, but it was a copy. There is no evidence concerning the provenance of the original, except that it must have been in Pomesanian.

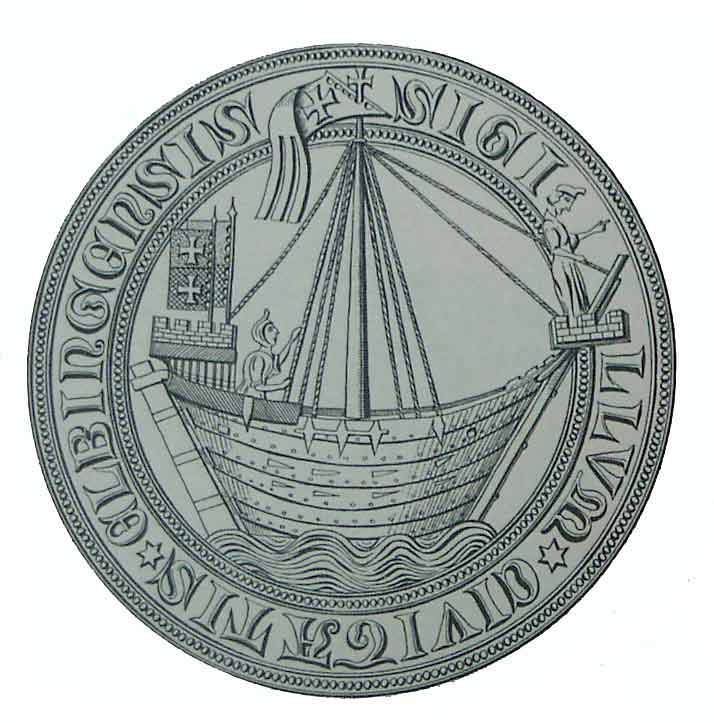
Seal of the city from 1350

In 1246 the town was granted a constitution under Lübeck law, used in maritime circumstances, instead of Magdeburg rights common in other cities in Central Europe. This decision of the Order was in keeping with its general strategy of espousing the trade association that in 1358 would become the Hanseatic League. The Order seized on this association early and used it to establish bases throughout the Baltic. The Order's involvement in the League was somewhat contradictory. In whatever cities they founded the ultimate authority was the commander of the town, who kept office in the citadel, typically used as a prison. Lübeck law, on the other hand, provided for self-government of the town.

In 1255, Sambor II, Duke of Pomerania and Jaromar II, Prince of Rügen allowed local merchants to trade within their duchies. In 1278, King Magnus the Lawmender of Norway also granted privileges to local merchants. The privileges of the Pomeranian dukes were later confirmed by Władysław I Łokietek and subsequent Polish kings. In 1294, King Philip IV of France allowed local merchants to sell their goods in Flanders. He also recruited the city's fleet to serve as French mercenaries in the event of a war. Membership in the Hanseatic League meant having important trading contacts with England, Flanders, France, and the Netherlands. The privilege of the Old Town was upgraded in 1343, while in 1393 it was granted an emporium privilege for grains, metals, and forest products.

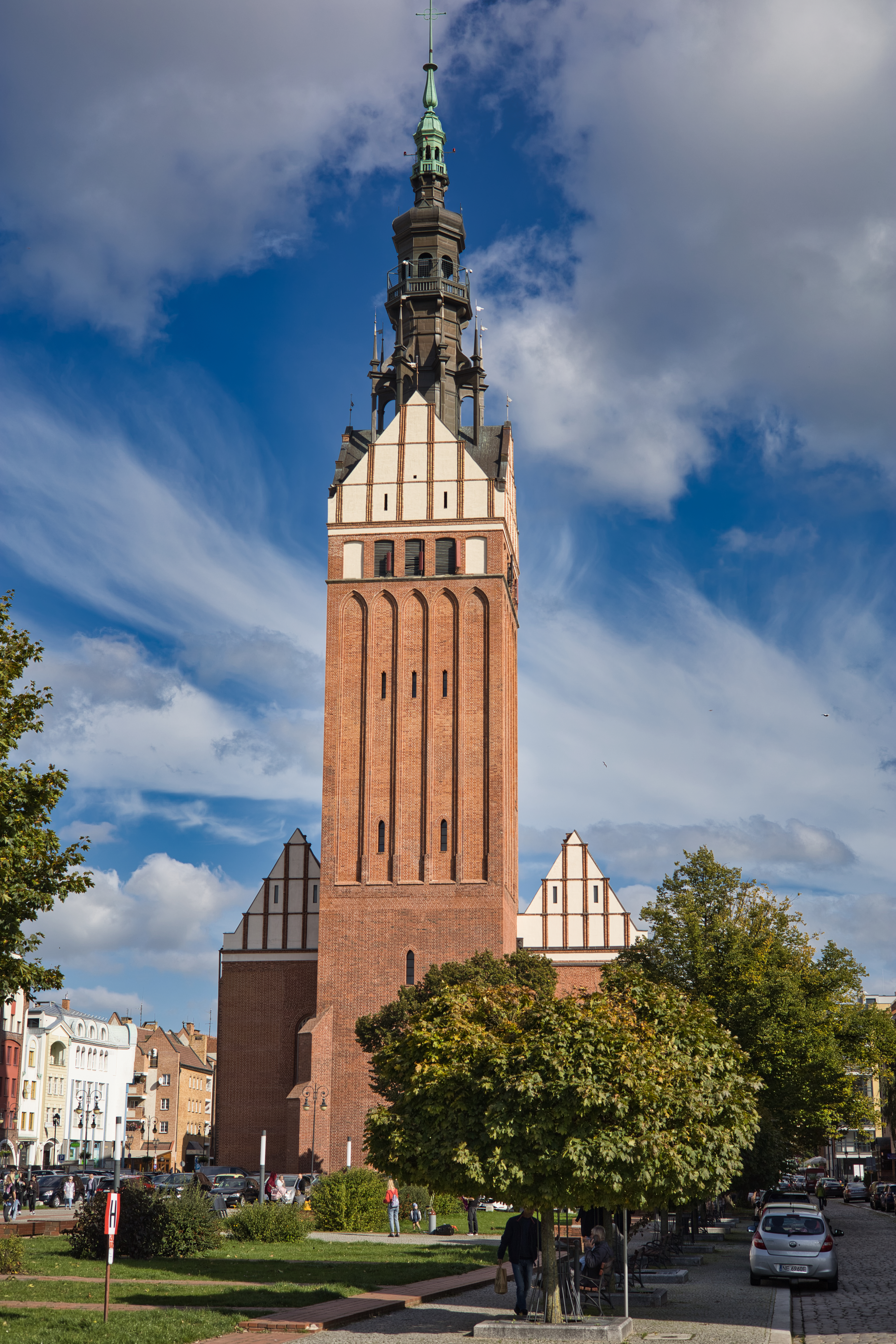
St. Nicholas Cathedral, the oldest church of Elbląg

Except for the citadel and churches, Elbing at the time was more of a small village by modern standards. Its area was 300-by-500-metre (980 ft × 1,640 ft). It featured a wharf, a marketplace and five streets, as well as a number of churches. The castle was completed in 1251. During the Great Prussian uprising of 1260–1274, in 1261, the inhabitants of Lidzbark took refuge here, bringing with them 12 Prussian prisoners of war, who were subsequently blinded and released. Afterwards, the Prussians unsuccessfully attacked the city twice. In 1288 fire destroyed the entire settlement except for the churches, which were of brick. A new circuit wall was started immediately. In 1313 and 1315, half of the population died to an epidemic. From 1315 to 1340 the city was rebuilt. A separate settlement called New Town was founded ca. 1337 and received Lübeck rights in 1347. In 1349 the Black Death struck the town, toward the end of the European plague. After the population recovered it continued building up the city and in 1364 a crane was built for the port.

The German-language Elbinger Rechtsbuch, written in Elbing documented among other laws for the first time Polish common law. The German-language Polish laws are based on the Sachsenspiegel and were written down to aid the judges. It is thus the oldest source for documented Polish common law and is in Polish referred to as the Księga Elbląska (Book of Elbląg). It was written down in the second half of the 13th century.

In 1367, the city's ships took part in the Hanseatic war against Denmark and Norway.

In 1410, during the Polish–Lithuanian–Teutonic War, the inhabitants of the city rebelled against the Teutonic Knights and expelled them, while welcoming Polish troops and paying homage to Polish King Władysław II Jagiełło, who afterwards vested Elbląg with new privileges. As the castle was lightly defended by a Polish garrison, the Teutonic Knights managed to retake it, promising the Polish defenders that they will be given free passage back to Poland. After the castle was taken, the Knights broke their promise and subsequently murdered a number of the captured defenders while imprisoning the rest. In 1414, Polish forces returned, but did not capture the city.

=== Kingdom of Poland ===
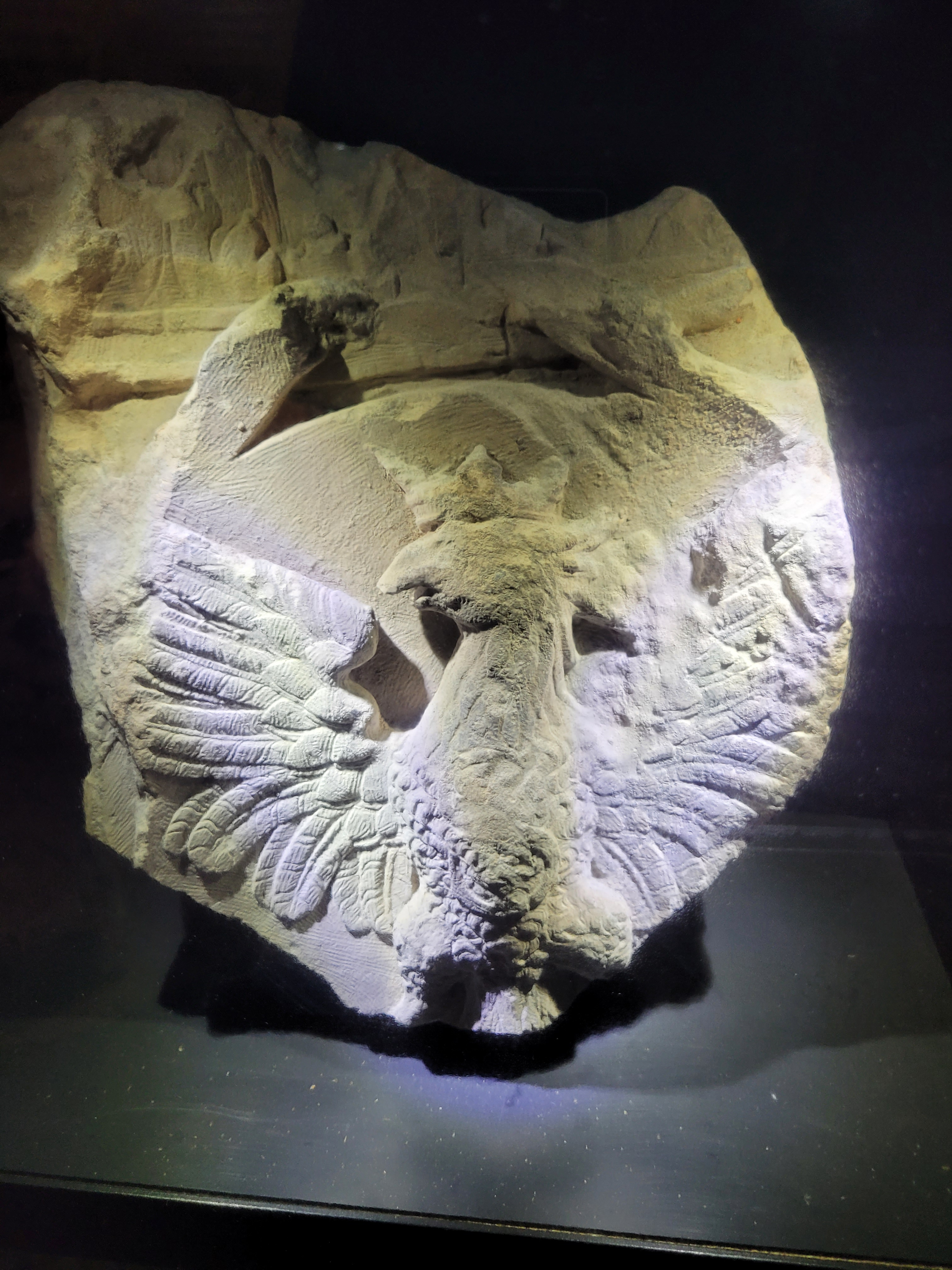
Renaissance relief with the coat of arms of Poland and the monogram of King Sigismund II Augustus from the facade of the former town hall

In February 1440, the city hosted a convention at which delegates from various cities (including Elbing itself) and nobility from the region decided to establish the anti-Teutonic Prussian Confederation. In April and May 1440, further meetings were held in Elbing, at which more towns and noblemen joined the organisation. In 1454, the organisation led the revolt against the rule of the Teutonic Knights, and then its delegation submitted a petition to King Casimir IV of Poland asking him to include the region within the Kingdom of Poland. The King agreed and signed the act of incorporation of the region (including Elbing) to the Kingdom of Poland in March 1454 in Kraków, which sparked the Thirteen Years' War, the longest of all Polish–Teutonic wars. The local mayor pledged allegiance to the Polish King during the incorporation in March 1454, and the burghers of Elbing recognized Casimir IV as rightful ruler. After paying homage to the King, the city was granted great privileges, similar to those of Thorn (Toruń) and Danzig (Gdańsk). Since 1454, the city was authorized by King Casimir IV to mint Polish coins. In June 1454, King Casimir IV was enthusiastically welcomed by the townspeople and he accepted the city's oath of allegiance. The war ended in a Polish victory in 1466, with the Second Peace of Thorn, in which the Teutonic Order renounced any claims to the city and recognised it as part of Poland.

Within the Kingdom of Poland, the city was administratively part of the Malbork Voivodeship in the newly established autonomous province of Royal Prussia, later also within the larger Greater Poland Province. With the creation of the Polish–Lithuanian Commonwealth in 1569, the city was brought under direct control of the Polish crown. As one of the largest and most influential cities of Poland, it enjoyed voting rights during the royal election period in Poland.

Elbląg was often visited by Nicolaus Copernicus between 1504 and 1530.

With the 16th century Protestant Reformation the burghers became Lutherans and the first Lutheran Gymnasium was established in 1535.

The population was hit by epidemics in 1549, 1564, 1602, 1620 and 1625.

From 1579 Elbląg had close trade relations with England, to which the city accorded free trade. English, Scottish, and Irish merchants settled in the city. They formed the Scottish Reformed Church of Elbing and became Elbing citizens. English merchants enjoyed extensive liberties in the city, including the right to their own courts, their own schools, freedom of religion, and many purchased houses and properties. They lost most of these privileges as a result of the Swedish occupation in 1628, and many left the city. The rivalry of nearby Danzig interrupted trading links several times. By 1618 Elbing had left the Hanseatic League owing to its close business dealings with England.

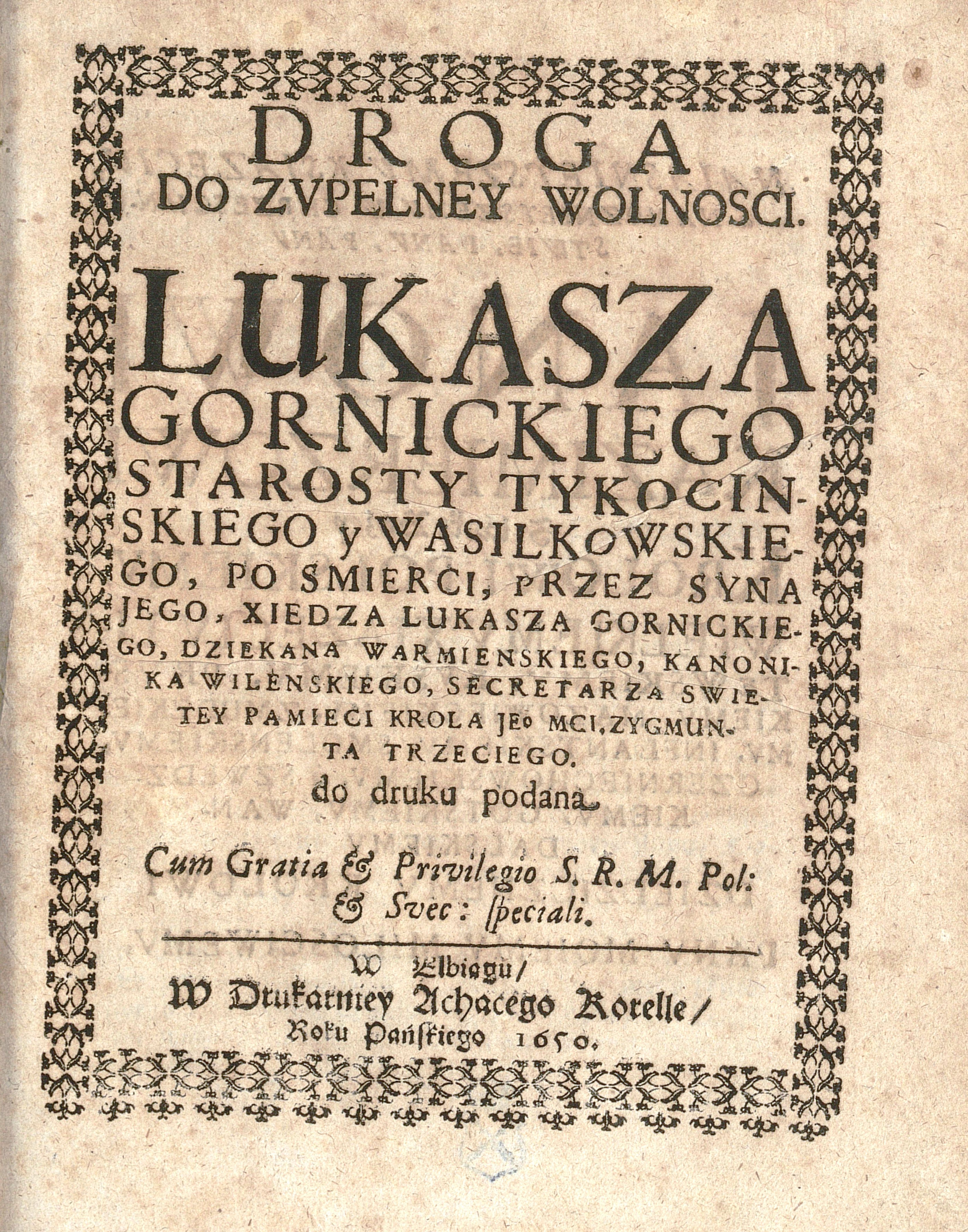
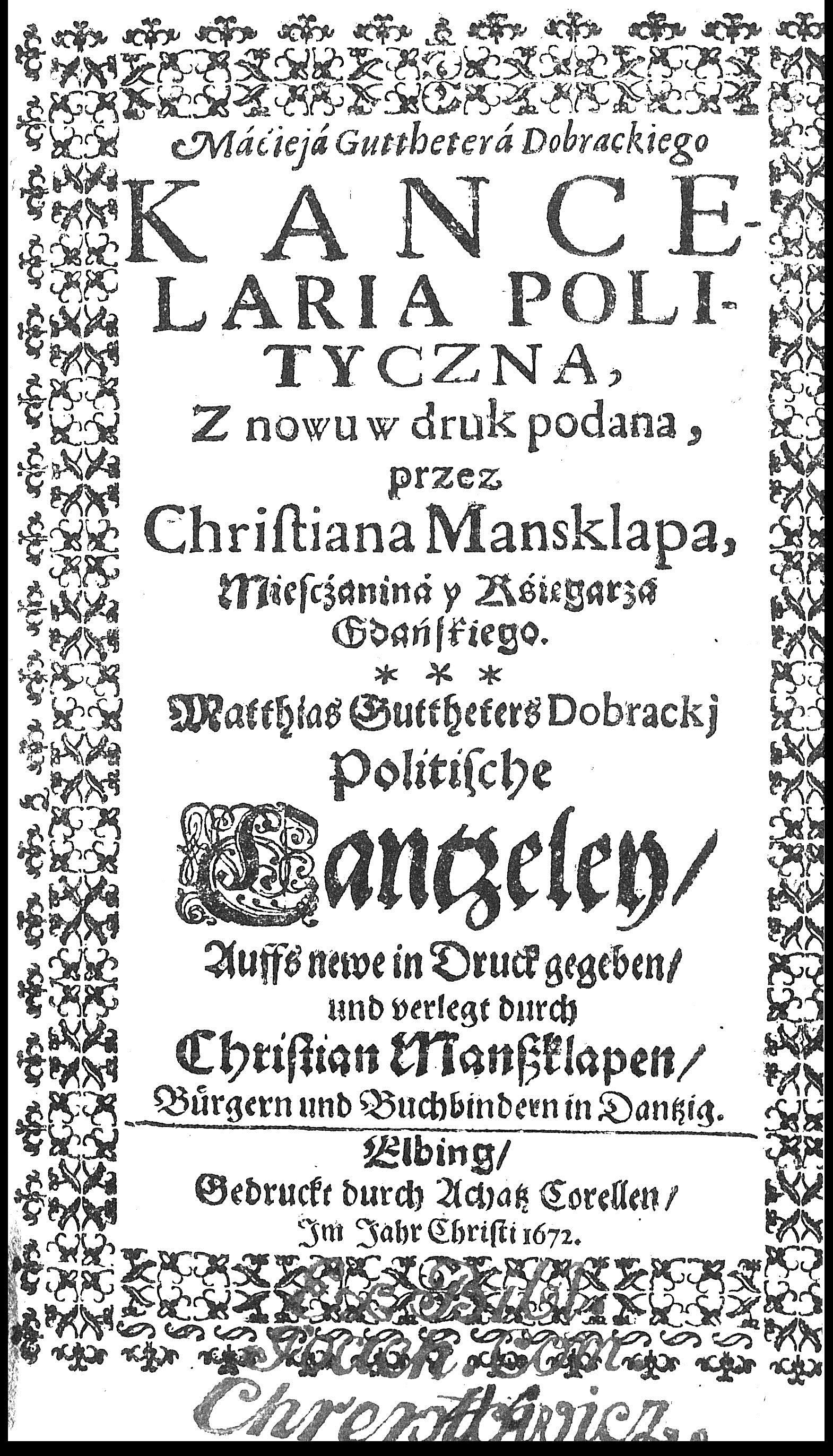
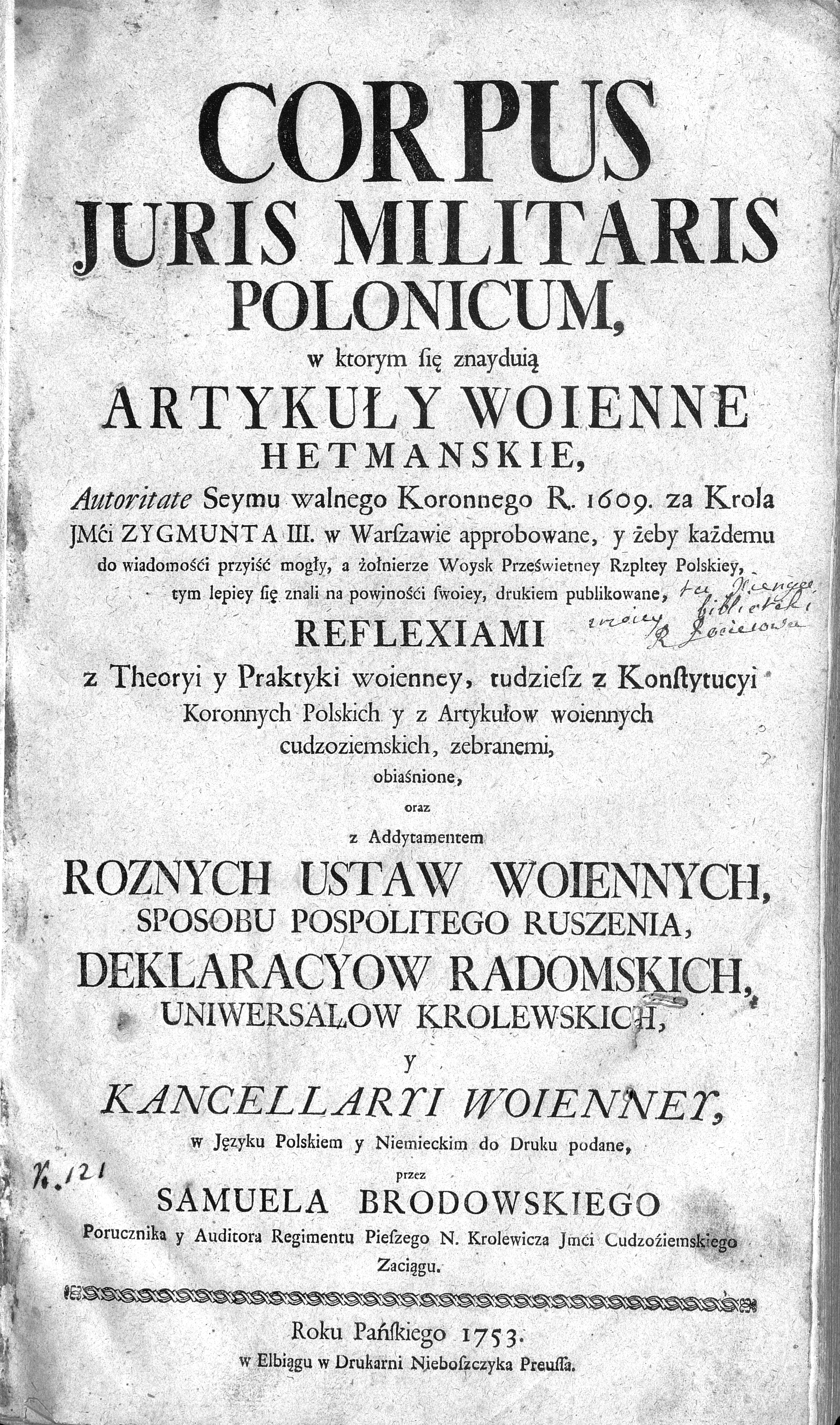
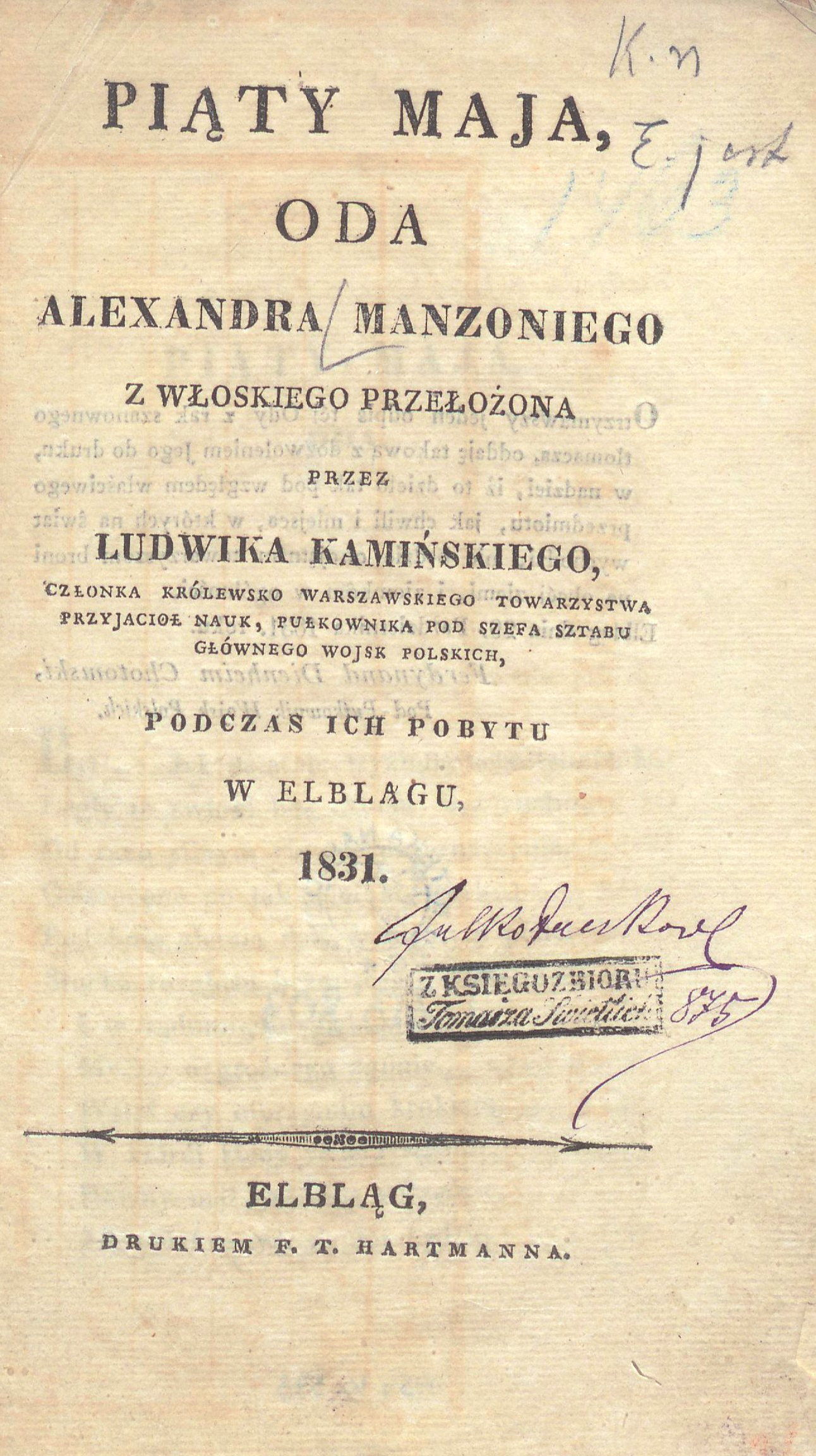
Polish publications from Elbląg from 1650–1831

The city was invaded and occupied by Swedish troops in 1626. The Swedes seized the St. Nicholas Church from the Catholics and held their own services there, and imposed contributions on the city's residents. The St. Nicholas Church was restored to the Catholics after the end of Swedish occupation. During the Thirty Years' War, Swedish Chancellor Axel Oxenstierna brought the Moravian Brethren refugee John Amos Comenius to Elbing for six years (1642–1648). In 1642 Johann Stobäus, who composed with Johann Eccard, published the Preussische Fest-Lieder, a number of evangelical Prussian songs. In 1646 the city recorder Daniel Barholz noted that the city council employed Bernsteindreher, or Paternostermacher, licensed and guilded amber craftsmen who worked on prayer beads, rosaries, and many other items made of amber. Members of the Barholz family became mayors and councillors.

During the Swedish invasion of Poland in 1655, the city was captured by Sweden after a battle, and over 3,000 people died to an epidemic the following year. Swedish occupation ended in 1660.

During the Swedish invasion of Poland of 1701–1706, Sweden occupied the city in 1703, and King Charles XII of Sweden stopped there for five days. In 1710, the city was occupied by Russia. The city was handed over to Polish King Augustus II in 1712.

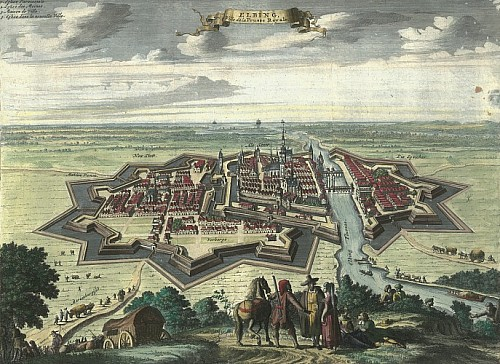
View of Elbing from a 1720 atlas by Pieter van der Aa, based on an earlier print by Matthäus Merian

During the War of the Polish Succession, in March 1734, the city was occupied by Russians, who supported Augustus III of Poland. On 19 August Voivode of Chełmno Jan Ansgary Czapski received the city's pledge of allegiance to King Augustus III of Poland, and on 28 August Russians left the city. The city came again under occupation by Russia from 1758 to 1762 during the Seven Years' War.

=== Kingdom of Prussia ===
During the First Partition of Poland in 1772 Elbląg was annexed by King Frederick the Great of the Kingdom of Prussia. Elbing became part of the newly established province of West Prussia in 1773.

During the Napoleonic Wars, the city was occupied without resistance by the French in January 1807. The French set up a military bakery in the local hospital and converted the gymnasium into a military hospital. On 8 May 1807, Napoleon held a military parade in the city. Napoleon stopped once again on 14 July 1807. French troops left on 13 December 1807. In 1812, the French returned during their march to Russia, and on 12 July 1812 Napoleon visited the city.

In the 1815 provincial reorganization following the Napoleonic Wars, Elbing and its hinterland were included within Regierungsbezirk Danzig in West Prussia.

In October and November 1831, various Polish infantry, cavalry and artillery units, engineer corps and sappers of the November Uprising stopped in the city and its environs on the way to their internment locations, whereas the general staff with Commander-in-Chief General Maciej Rybiński and generals Józef Bem, Marcin Klemensowski, Kazimierz Małachowski, Ludwik Michał Pac and Antoni Wroniecki was interned in the city. On 22 December 1831 the Prussian army attempted to pacify the Polish insurgents and launched a charge on the disarmed Poles, who resisted relocation, fearing deportation to the Russian Partition of Poland. Some insurgents eventually left partitioned Poland for the Great Emigration, including Józef Bem, who was expelled by the Prussians in December 1831, and Maciej Rybiński, who left the city in February 1832.

Elbing industrialized. In 1828 the first steamship was built by Ignatz Grunau. In 1837 Ferdinand Schichau started the Schichau-Werke company in Elbing as well as another shipyard in Danzig (Gdańsk) later on. Schichau constructed the Borussia, the first screw-vessel in Germany. Schichau-Werke built hydraulic machinery, ships, steam engines, and torpedoes. After the inauguration of the railway to Königsberg in 1853, Elbing's industry began to grow. Schichau worked together with his son-in-law Carl H. Zise, who continued the industrial complex after Schichau's death. Schichau erected large complexes for his many thousands of workers.

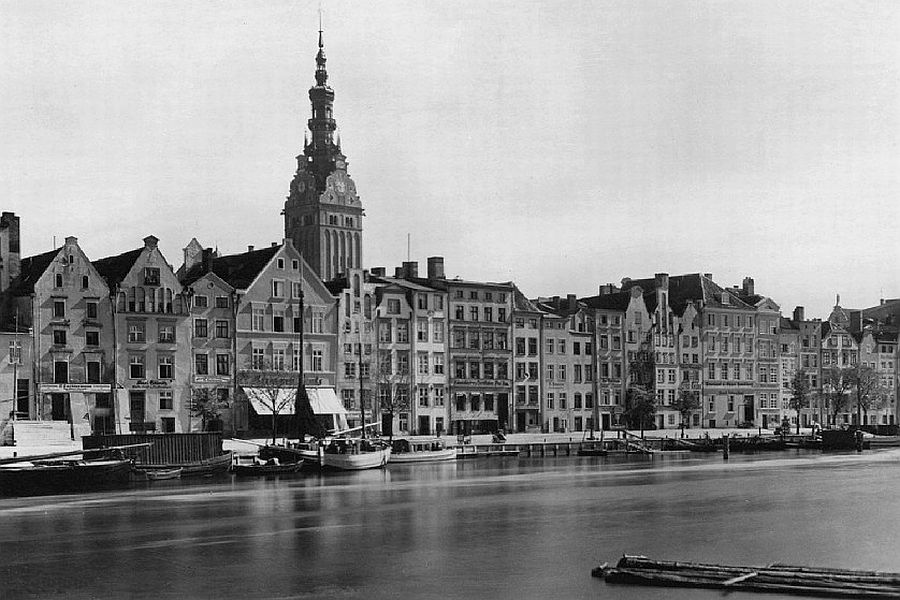
Panorama from Granary Island in 1930

Georg Steenke, an engineer from Königsberg, connected Elbing near the Baltic Sea with the southern part of Prussia by building the Oberländischer Kanal (Elbląg Canal).

Elbing became part of the Prussian-led German Empire in 1871 during the unification of Germany. As Elbing became an industrial city, the Social Democratic Party of Germany (SPD) frequently received the majority of votes; in the 1912 Reichstag elections the SPD received 51% of the vote. After World War I, as most of the province of West Prussia was reintegrated with the reborn Polish Republic, Elbing was joined to the German province of East Prussia, and was separated from Weimar Germany by the so-called Polish Corridor.

=== Nazi Germany ===
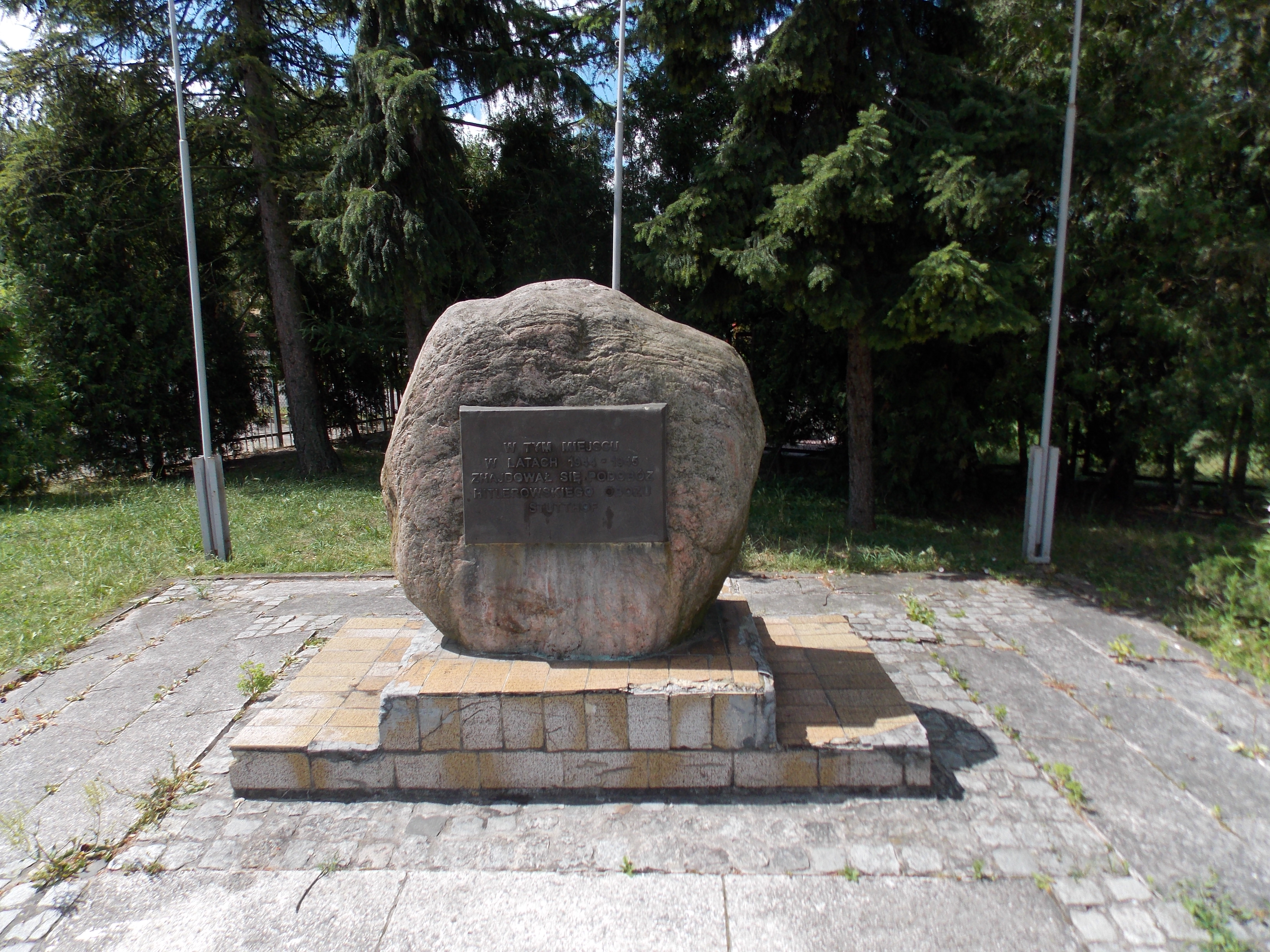
Memorial at the site of a subcamp of the Stutthof concentration camp

During World War II, under Nazi Germany, a Nazi prison, a forced labour subcamp of the Stalag I-A POW camp, a forced labour subcamp of the Stalag XX-B POW camp, and three subcamps of the Stutthof concentration camp were operated in the city. The Germans also enslaved Poles as forced labour in the city. The Polish resistance was active and infiltrated the German arms industry. Dozens of Polish resistance members were held in the local prison, and at least 15 were sentenced to death in the city in 1942.

The prison and forced labour camps were closed and many of the German inhabitants forced to flee as the Soviet Red Army approached the city toward the end of the war. Laid under siege since 23 January 1945, about 65% of the city infrastructure was destroyed, including most of the historical city center. The town was captured by the Soviet Red Army during the night of 9–10 February 1945. During the first days of the siege most of the population of approximately 100,000 persons fled. After the end of war, in spring 1945, the region together with the city became again part of Poland, although with a Soviet-installed communist regime, as a result of the Potsdam Conference. As of 1 November 1945 16.838 Germans remained in the town. Polish rule over the town was implemented on 1 April 1945, hence, much before the Allies' decisions at the later Potsdam Conference. Many of Elbings' residents were interned and eventually expelled. The Polish authorities made a determined effort to establish a demographic fait accomplit before the Allies would take decisions on Germany's future.

=== History after 1945 ===
Out of the new inhabitants, 98% were Poles expelled from former eastern Polish areas annexed by the Soviet Union. In the following years, the Polish anti-communist resistance was active in Elbląg, including a local youth organisation and Konfederacja Ruch Oporu (Resistance Movement Confederation) based in Kwidzyn.

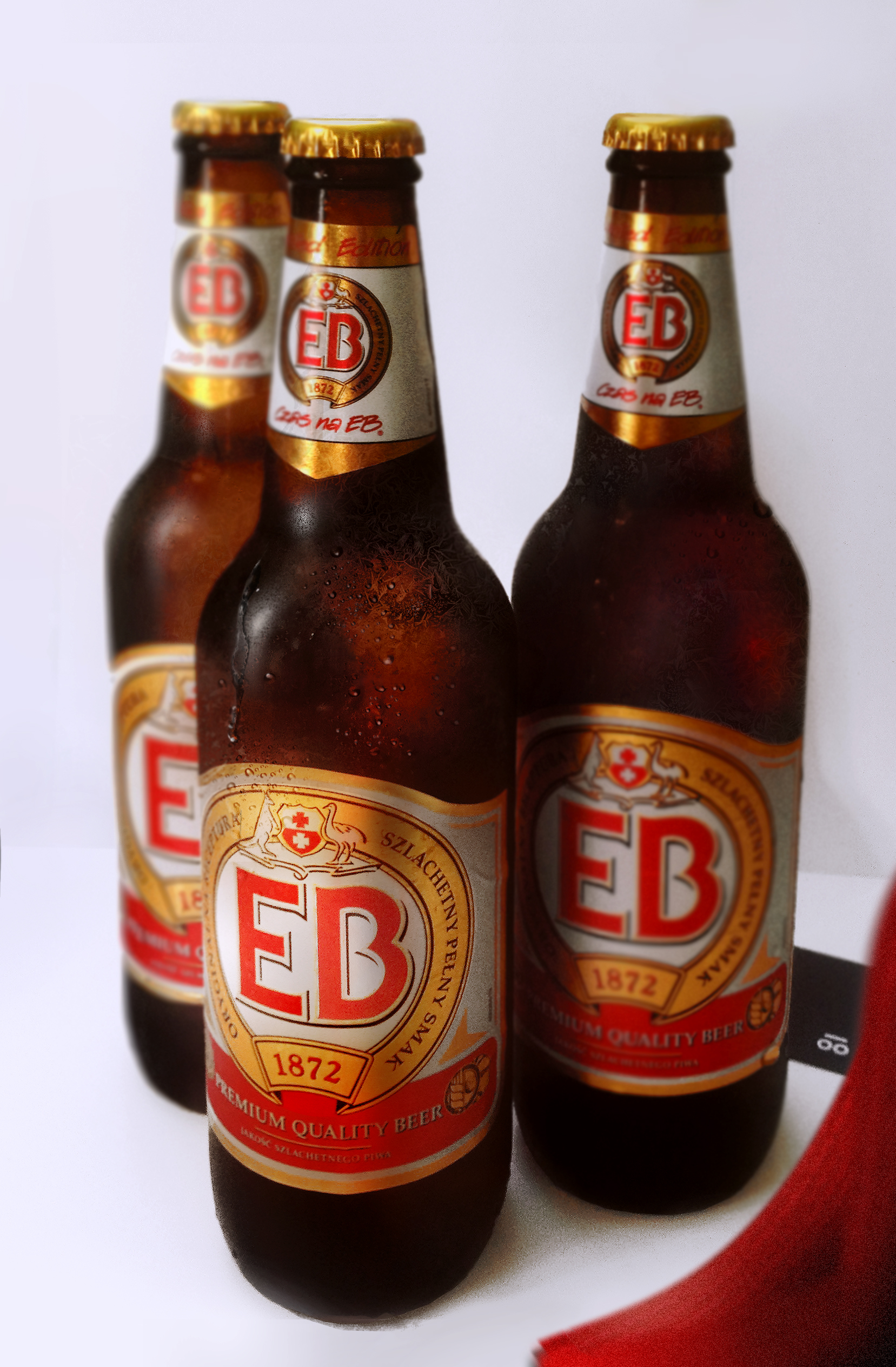
EB, Polish beer produced by the Elbrewery Company in Elbląg

Parts of the damaged historical city center were completely demolished, with the bricks being used to rebuild Warsaw and Gdańsk. The Communist authorities had originally planned that the Old Town, utterly destroyed during the fighting since 23 January 1945, would be built over with blocks of flats; however, economic difficulties thwarted this effort. Two churches were reconstructed and the remaining ruins of the old town were torn down in the 1960s.

Along with Tricity and Szczecin, Elbląg was the scene of the Polish 1970 protests. Since 1990 the German minority population has had a modest resurgence, with the Elbinger Deutsche Minderheit Organization counting around 450 members in 2000.

Restoration of the Old Town began after 1989. Since the beginning of the restoration, an extensive archaeological programme has been carried out. Most of the city's heritage was destroyed during the construction of basements in the 19th century or during World War II, but the backyards and latrines of the houses remained largely unchanged, and have provided information on the city's history. In some instances, private investors have incorporated parts of preserved stonework into new architecture. By 2006, approximately 75% of the Old Town had been reconstructed.

Elbląg is also home to the Elbrewery, Poland's largest brewery, which belongs to the Żywiec Group (Heineken). The history of the Elblag Brewing Tradition dates back to 1309, when Teutonic Master Siegfried von Leuchtwangen granted brewing privileges to the city. The present brewery was founded in 1872 as the Elbinger Aktien-Brauerei. In the early 1900s, the brewery was the exclusive supplier of Pilsner beer to the court of German Emperor Wilhelm II.

== Historic buildings ==
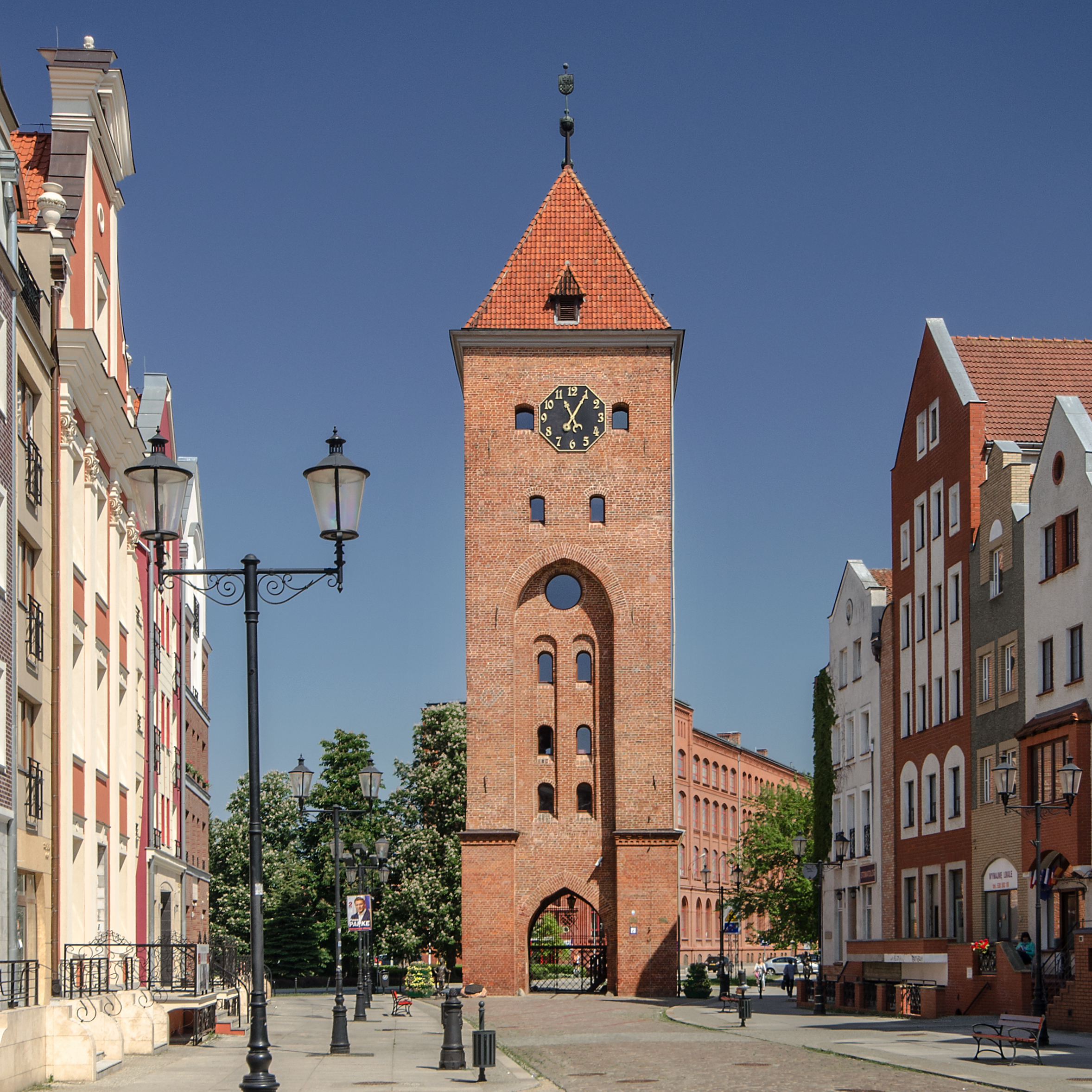
Brama Targowa (Market Gate)

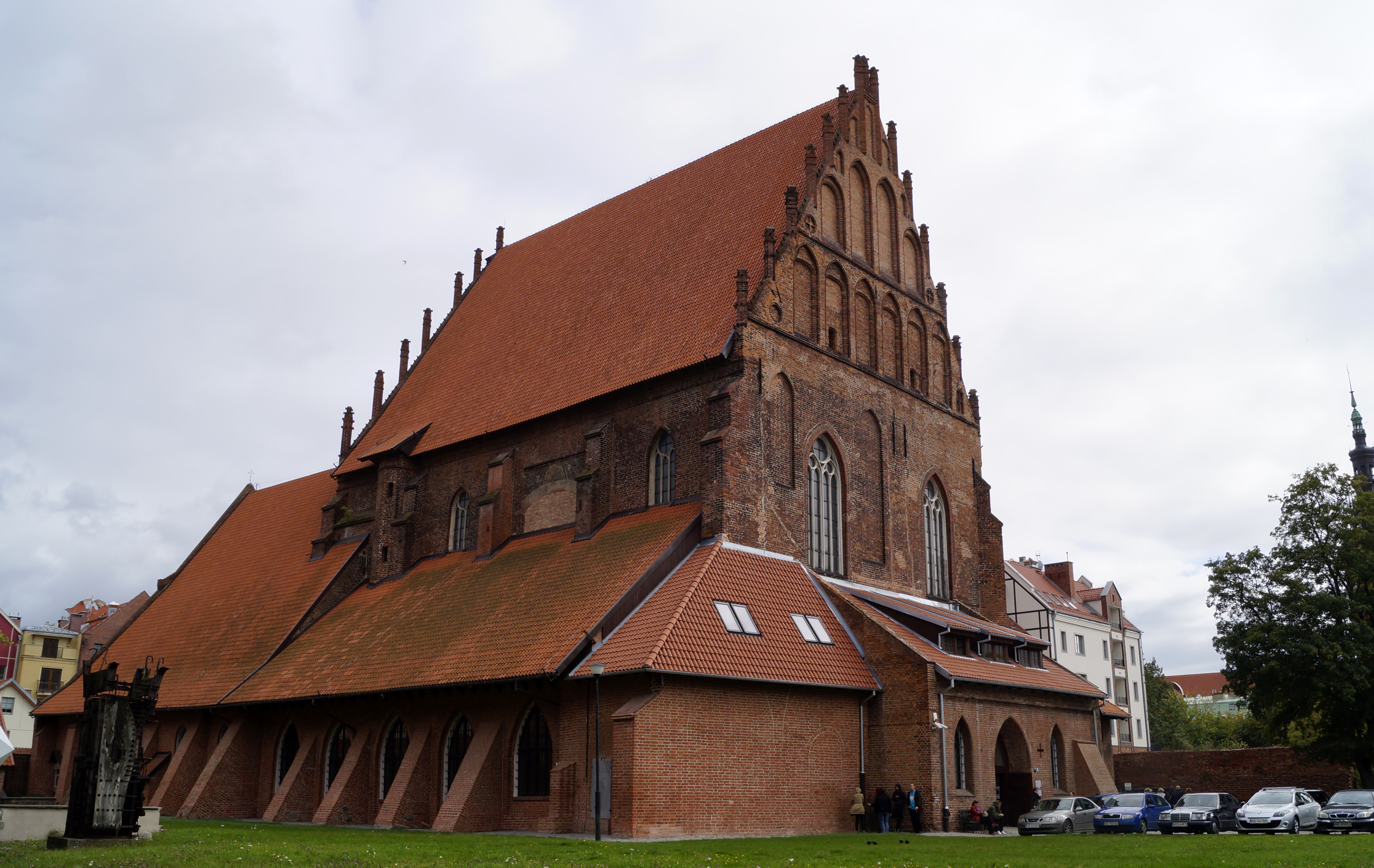
Former Dominican church

Until World War II there were many Gothic, Renaissance and Baroque houses in Elbląg's Old Town; some of them are reconstructed. Other preserved buildings are:

- St. Nicholas Cathedral - a monumental 13th-century Gothic church (cathedral only from 1992, before it was a parochial church), destroyed by fire in the late 18th century, then damaged in World War II and repaired
- Brama Targowa (Market Gate) - erected in 1319
- St. Mary's Church - former Dominican church, erected in the 13th century, rebuilt in the 14th and 16th centuries; damaged in World War II and reconstructed in 1961 as an art gallery; remnants of cloister are partially preserved
- Holy Ghost church with hospital, from the 14th century
- Corpus Christi church from the 14th century
- Ścieżka kościelna (Church Path) - medieval path between tenements connecting the churches of the Old Town
- Gothic houses at 13 Świętego Ducha Street and 34 Studzienna Street (reconstruction)
- Mannerist houses of the Old Town, e.g. Jost van Kampen House at 12 Garbary Street
- Postmodern reconstruction of the Old Town with new Old Town City Hall
- Church of Good Shepherd - originally Mennonite, now Polish Old Catholic church from 1890

The Elbląg Canal, built in 1825–44, is a tourist site of Elbląg. The canal is believed to be one of the most important monuments related to the history of engineering, and has been named one of the Seven Wonders of Poland. The canal was also named one of Poland's official national Historic Monuments (Pomnik historii) in 2011. Its listing is maintained by the National Heritage Board of Poland.

== Culture ==
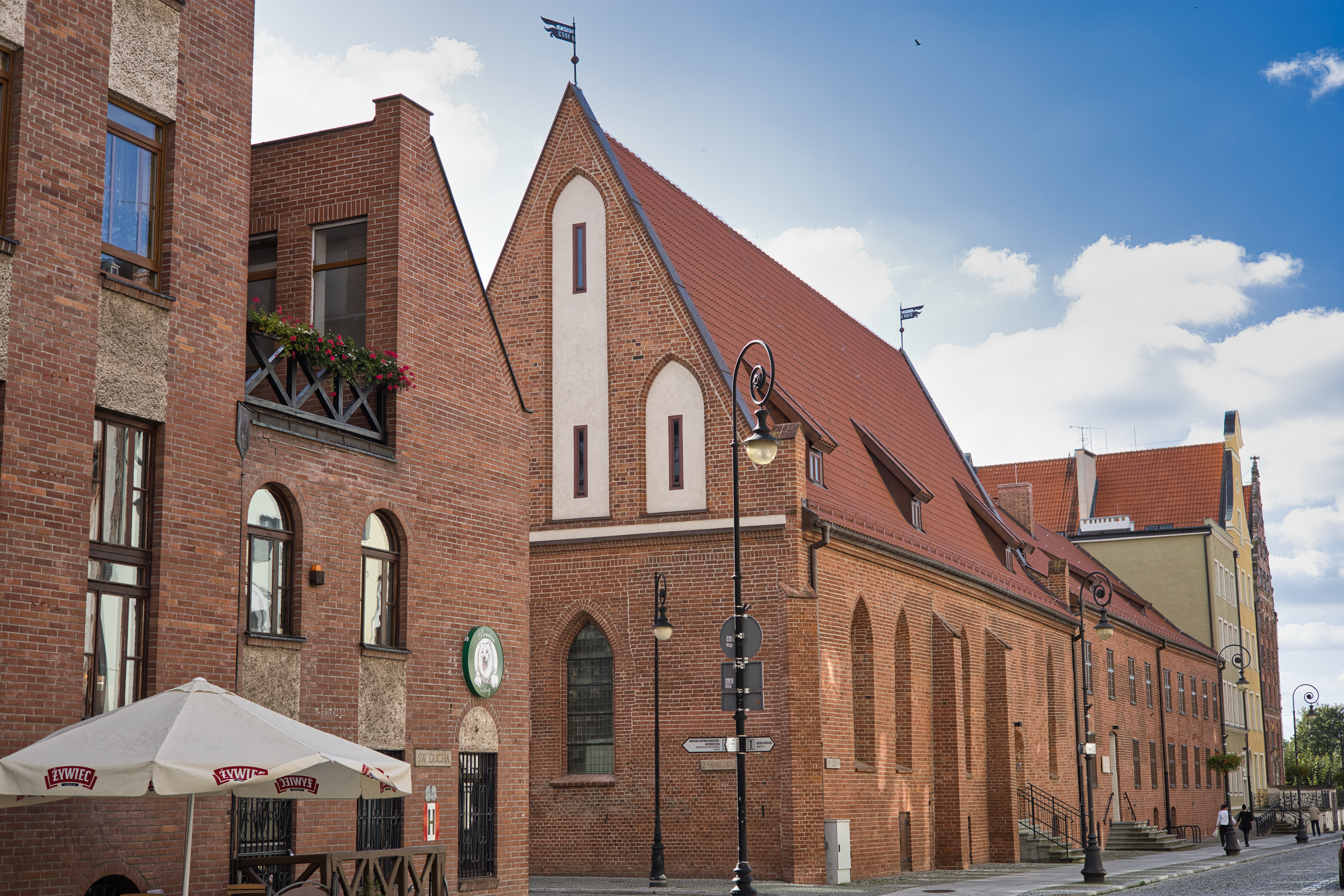
Cyprian Norwid Elbląg Library

The primary cultural institutions in Elbląg are the Archaeological and Historical Museum, the Cyprian Norwid Elbląg Library, the EL Gallery Art Center and the Aleksander Sewruk Theater. The museum presents many pieces of art and items of everyday use, including the only 15th-century binoculars preserved in Europe.

== Population ==
Historical population

Year	Pop.	±%
1772	11,952	—
1781	15,768	+31.9%
1831	17,761	+12.6%
1843	20,153	+13.5%
1875	33,520	+66.3%
1880	35,842	+6.9%
1885	38,278	+6.8%
1890	41,576	+8.6%

Year	Pop.	±%
1900	52,518	+26.3%
1910	58,636	+11.6%
1925	67,878	+15.8%
1933	71,986	+6.1%
1939	85,925	+19.4%
1945	22,179	−74.2%
1950	48,112	+116.9%
1960	76,513	+59.0%

Year	Pop.	±%
1970	90,051	+17.7%
1980	110,221	+22.4%
1990	126,056	+14.4%
2000	128,305	+1.8%
2010	126,049	−1.8%
2020	118,582	−5.9%
2021	117,390	−1.0%

== Transport ==
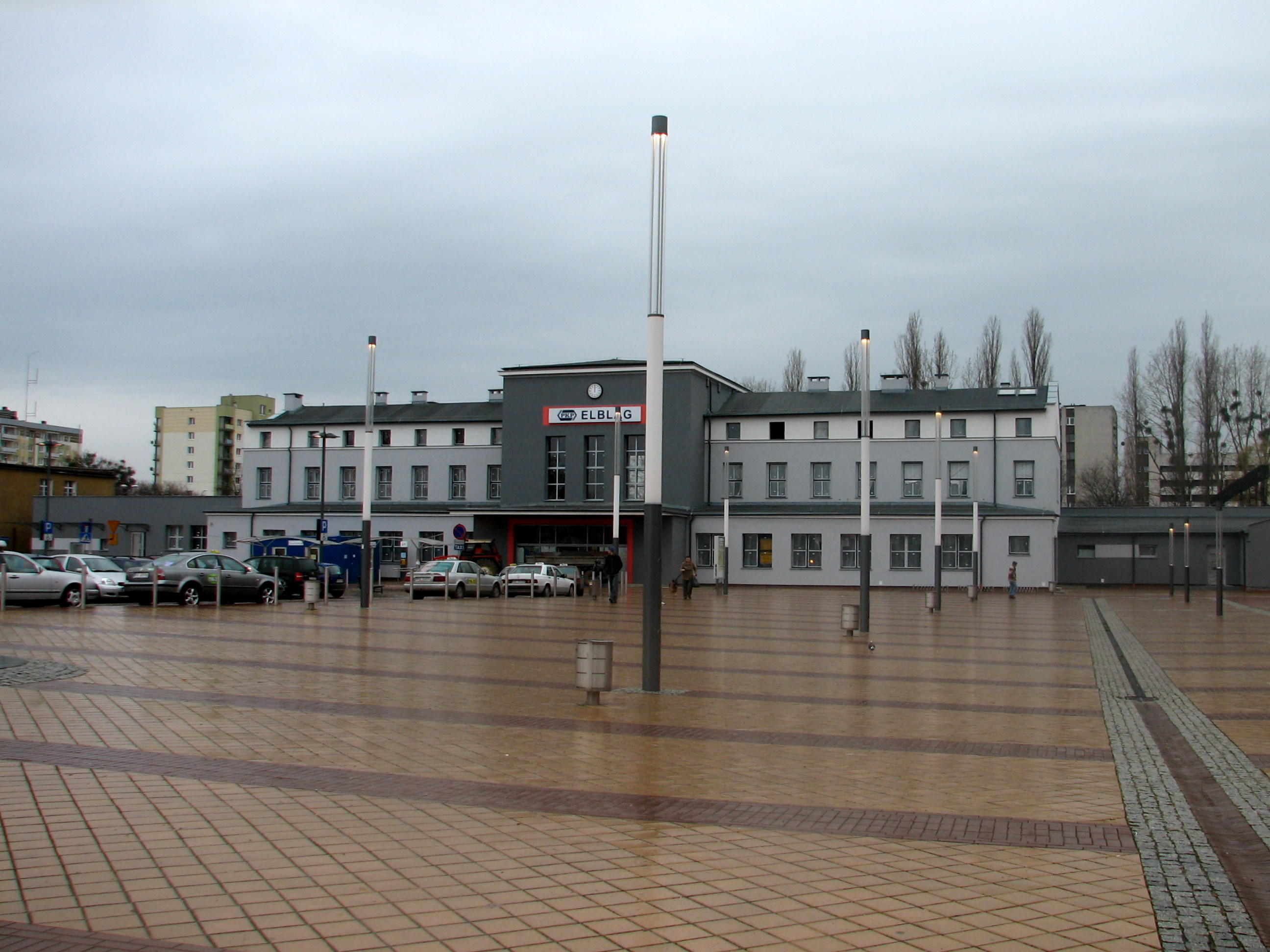
Elbląg Main Train Station

The S7 Expressway runs through the south of the city. The S22 Expressway also runs through the city.

The city is served by rail transit through PKP Intercity and Polregio through Elbląg Main station in the south of the city.

The city maintains an extensive tram network with 5 lines. In addition to this, the city also operates a bus network that services the entire city.

== Institutions of higher education ==
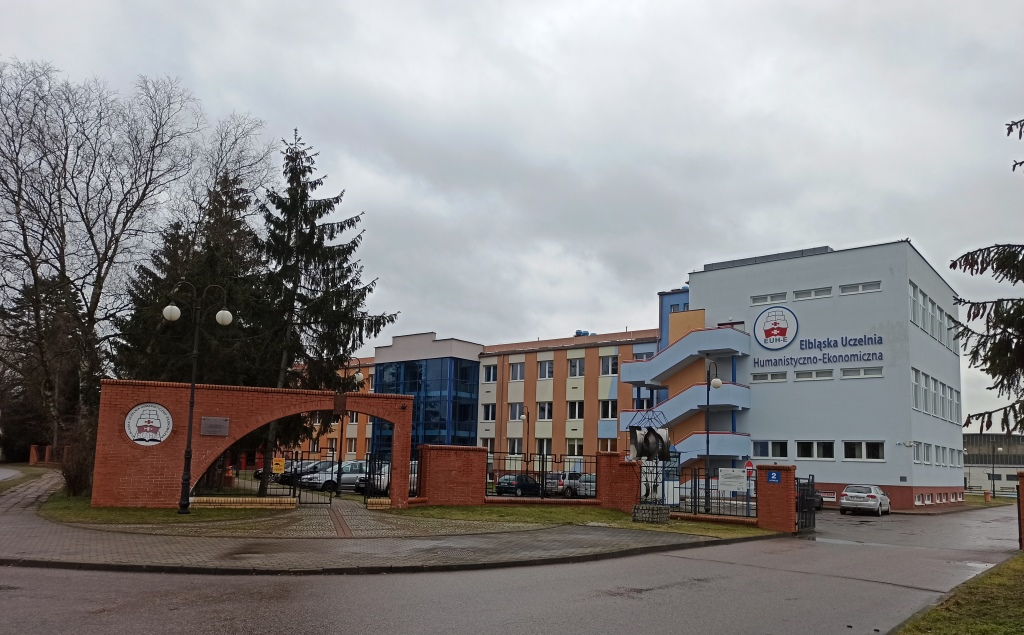
Elbląg Higher School of Arts and Economics

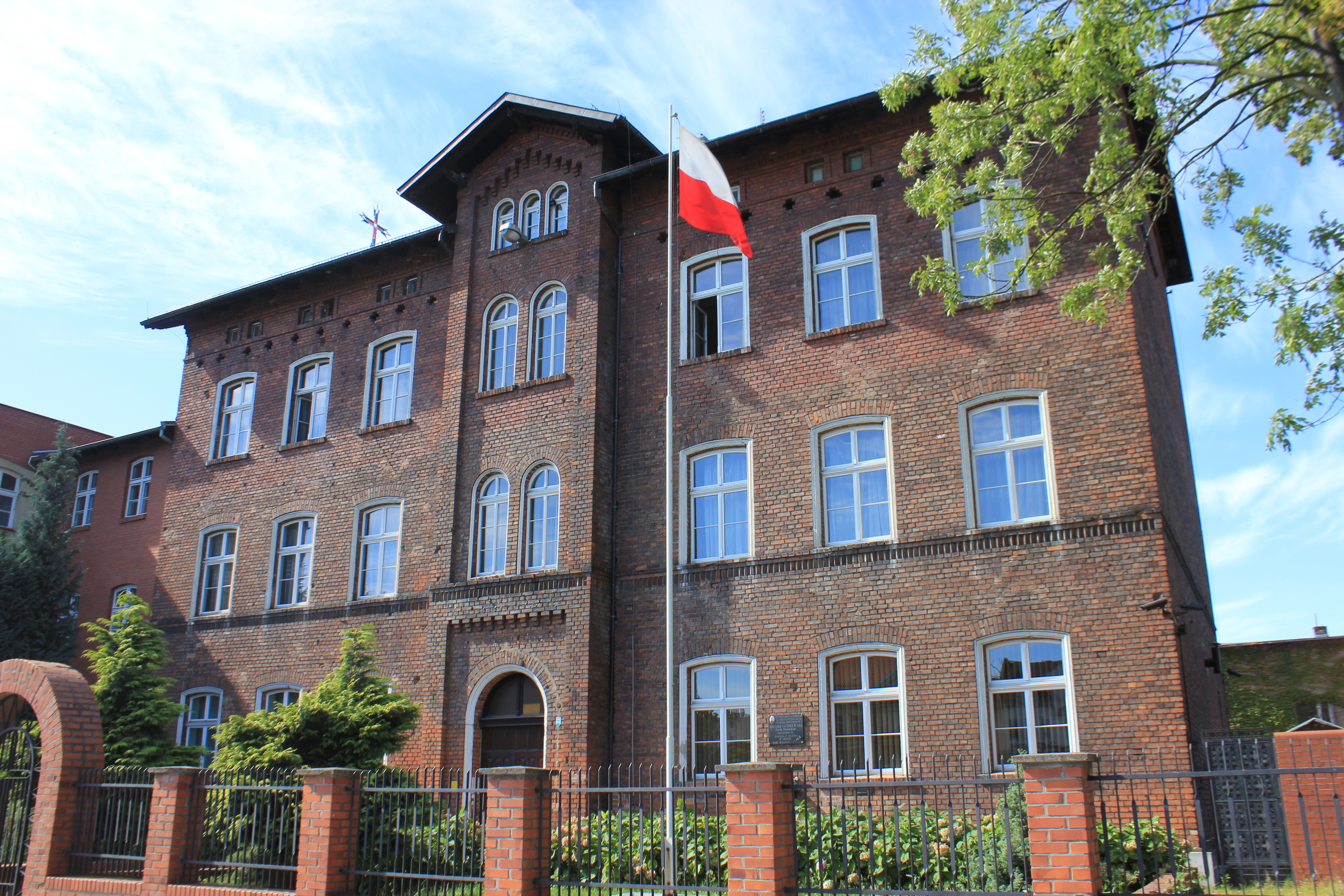
Theological Seminary in Elbląg

- Elbląg Higher School of Arts and Economics (Polish: Elbląska Uczelnia Humanistyczno-Ekonomiczna)
  - Faculty of Pedagogy
  - Faculty of Administration
  - Faculty of Health Sciences
  - Faculty of Economics and Politics
- Elbląg Higher State College of Vocational Education (Państwowa Wyższa Szkoła Zawodowa)
  - Faculty of Pedagogy and Foreign Languages
  - Faculty of Economics
  - Faculty of Applied Computer Science
  - Faculty of Technical Sciences
- Bogdan Jański Higher School, Faculty in Elbląg (Szkoła Wyższa im. Bogdana Jańskiego)
  - Faculty of Management and Land Management
- Elbląg Diocese Theological Seminary (Wyższe Seminarium Duchowne Diecezji Elbląskiej)
- Regent College - Foreign Language Teacher Training College (Regent College - Nauczycielskie Kolegium Języków Obcych)
  - Faculty of English Studies

== Sports ==
Professional sports teams
Club	Sport	League	Trophies
Start Elbląg	Women's handball	Superliga	2 Polish Championships (1992, 1994); 3 Polish Cups (1993, 1994, 1999)
Olimpia Elbląg	Men's football	II liga	0

== Politics ==
=== Constituency ===
Members of Parliament (Sejm) elected from Elbląg constituency.

- Jan Antochowski, SLD-UP
- Danuta Ciborowska, SLD-UP
- Witold Gintowt-Dziewałtowski, SLD-UP
- Stanisław Gorczyca, PO
- Jerzy Müller, SLD-UP
- Adam Ołdakowski, Samoobrona
- Andrzej Umiński, SLD-UP
- Stanisław Żelichowski, PSL

== International relations ==
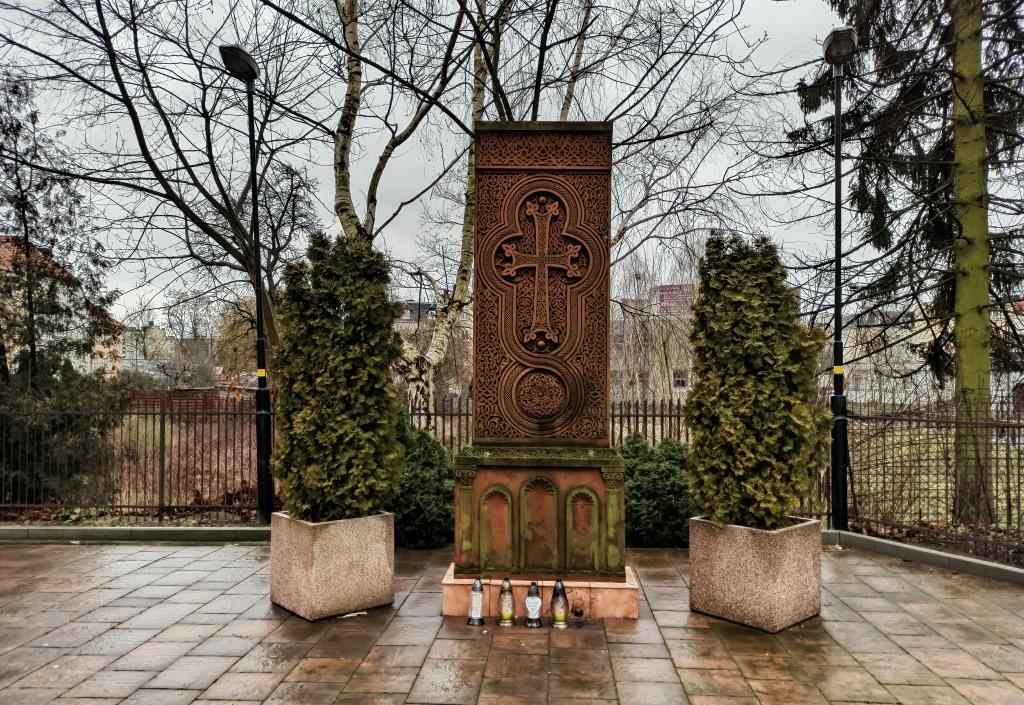
Khachkar in Elbląg

In Elbląg, there is a khachkar dedicated to Polish-Armenian friendship and the victims of the Turkish-perpetrated Armenian genocide of 1915.

There is an Honorary Consulate of Moldova in Elbląg.

=== Twin towns – sister cities ===
Elbląg is twinned with:

- Ternopil, Ukraine (since 1992)
- Leer, Germany (since 23 June 2001)
- Ronneby, Sweden (since 1991)
- Druskininkai, Lithuania (since 1996)
- Liepāja, Latvia (since 1991)
- Compiègne, France (since 2002)
- Trowbridge, United Kingdom (since March 31, 2000)
- Coquimbo, Chile (since 1995)
- Baoji, People's Republic of China (since 1997)
- Tainan, Taiwan (since April 29, 2004)
- Nowy Sącz, Poland

=== Former twin towns ===
- Kaliningrad, Kaliningrad Oblast, Russia (since 1994 until 2022)
- Baltiysk, Kaliningrad Oblast, Russia (since 1994 until 2022)
- Novogrudok, Belarus (since 1995 until 2022)

On 28 February 2022, Elbląg ended its partnership with the Russian cities of Kaliningrad and Baltiysk and the Belarusian city of Novogrudok as a response to the 2022 Russian invasion of Ukraine and its active support by the Republic of Belarus.

== Notable people ==
- Georg Kleefeld (1522–1576), mayor of Danzig
- Hans von Bodeck (1582–1658), diplomat and Chancellor of Brandenburg
- John Amos Comenius (1592–1670), educator
- Samuel Hartlib (c. 1600–1662), teacher and scientist
- Christian Wernicke (1661–1725), epigrammist and diplomat
- Charles Aloysius Ramsay (1677–1680) Scottish-Prussian writer on stenography and translator
- Johann Friedrich Endersch (1705–1769), mathematician and cartographer
- Gottfried Achenwall (1719–1772), statistician
- Eberhard Gottlieb Graff (1780–1841) German philologist.
- Wilhelm Baum (1799–1883) a German surgeon
- Wilhelm Eduard Albrecht (1800–1876), lawyer, member of Göttinger Sieben
- Bruno Erhard Abegg (1803–1848), statesman of Königsberg
- Ferdinand Schichau (1814–1896), founder of the Schichau-Werke in Elbing and Danzig
- John Prince-Smith (1809–1874), liberal economist and politician in Germany
- Johannes Kohtz (1843–1918), German chess player
- Reinhold Felderhoff (1865–1919) German sculptor.
- Maximilian Consbruch (1866–1927), German classical philologist and gymnasium principal
- Hermann Schulz (1872–1929), German politician
- Paul Pulewka (1896–1989) German pharmacologist
- Max Reimann (1898–1977), president of the Communist Party of Germany
- Erich Brost (1903–1995) publisher
- Günter Kuhnke (1912–1990), Admiral
- Hans-Dieter Lange (1926–2012), journalist
- Hans-Jürgen Krupp (1933–2024) German politician, economist and University professor
- Brigitte Birnbaum (1938–2024) German author of books, mainly for children and young people
- Ursula Karusseit (1939–2019), German actress
- Bernd Neumann (born 1942), German politician
- Ortwin Runde (born 1944), mayor of Hamburg from 1997 to 2001.
- Andrzej Sakson (born 1950), sociologist and director of the Western Institute
- Henryk Iwaniec (born 1947), mathematician
- Wojciech Cejrowski (born 1964), journalist, writer
- Adam Fedoruk (born 1966), footballer
- Ewa Białołęcka (born 1967), fantasy writer
- Piotr Wadecki (born 1973), cyclist
- Maciej Bykowski (born 1977), footballer
- Adam Wadecki (born 1977), cyclist
- Dominika Figurska (born 1978), actress
- Radosław Wojtaszek (born 1987), chess grandmaster
- Krzysztof Jotko (born 1989), MMA fighter
- Joanna Wołosz (born 1990), volleyball player

== See also ==
- EB - Polish beer produced by the Elbrewery Company
