= Consbruch =

Consbruch is a surname. Notable people with the surname include:

- Joachim von Berenberg-Consbruch (born 1940) (né Joachim von Consbruch), German banker
- Jomaine Consbruch (born 2002), German footballer
- Maximilian Friedrich Julius Consbruch (1866–1927), German philologist
- Paul Consbruch (1930–2012), German Roman Catholic bishop
