= Hans von Bodeck =

Prussian diplomat

Hans von Bodeck (1582 – 23 June 1658) was a Prussian diplomat and chancellor of the Hohenzollern Prince-electors of Brandenburg-Prussia.

== Biography ==
Bodeck came from a prominent patrician family of Elbing (modern-day Elbląg) in the Polish province of Royal Prussia. His grandfather was the burgomaster, while his father was a city councilman. His ancestor Johann III von Bodeck (1542–1595) received imperial status from Emperor Rudolf II and was allowed to improve the family's coat of arms. The family also held offices in Danzig (Gdańsk).

In order to find a trading partner Bodeck was sent on a diplomatic mission from Elbing throughout Europe. During that time he wrote liber amicorum, which is now studied by musicologists. During his diplomatic tour Bodeck visited the Netherlands, France, Switzerland, and England, where he attended the Universities of Oxford and Cambridge. He attended the funeral ceremony for Queen Elizabeth I of England and the coronation of the new English king, James I. The council of Elbing had sent two delegates with dual missions: firstly, to pay its respects to the new king and secondly to oppose the transfer of English trade from Elbing to nearby Danzig.

In 1604 Bodeck left for London and met John Dowland, Philip Rosseter, and Thomas Campion. All three composers of lute songs lived in the same district of London. Bodeck befriended them, and Campion wrote a song dedicated to Bodeck. Many people from England and Scotland came to live in Elbling.

Later that year Bodeck left for Paris and met Count Christopher von Dohna, a nobleman of Prussia, who lived 15 km from Elbing. Bodeck then became the chancellor to Elector Joachim Frederick of Brandenburg. He died in 1658 in Hamburg.

A collection of pieces for lute was purchased by Dohna and kept at the Elbing library. In 1929 Hans Bauer wrote a full description of the register of Bodeck. During the capture of Elbing by the Soviet Red Army in 1945 during World War II and the subsequent expulsion of the city's German populace, the library was destroyed. Many Prussian documents and original manuscripts have since been discovered in Kraków, leading music researchers to hope that some of Bodeck's works might resurface.
