= Flag of Elbląg =

Polish municipal flag

Elbląg
- Proportion: 15:22 (Note: The flag proportions based on the illustration attached to the city by-law of Elbląg. Proportions are not defined in any written document itself.)
- Adopted: 1993 (current version); 14th century (first version of the city banner)
- Design: Rectangle divided horizontally into two stripes, white and red, with red stripe being slightly higher. In each stripe, to the left from the centre, is placed a cross pattée with triangular arms, that is of the opposite colour to the stripe

The flag of the city of Elbląg, in the Warmian-Masurian Voivodeship, Poland, is a rectangle divided horizontally into two stripes, white and red, with red stripe being slightly higher. In each stripe, to the left from the centre, is placed a cross pattée with triangular arms, that is of the opposite colour to the stripe. The flag was adopted in 1993.

== Design ==
The flag of Elbląg is a rectangle divided horizontally into two stripes, white on the top, and red on the bottom. The bottom stripe is higher than the upper one. In each stripe, to the left from the centre, is placed a cross pattée with triangular arms, that is of the opposite colour to the stripe. The flag's proportions are not defined in any written document, however the illustration attached to the city by-law shows an aspect ratio of 15:22, height to width and 8:7 red to white for the height of the stripes.

The flag was based on the historical banner used by the city in 14th century.

== History ==
The Hanseatic flag of Elbląg used since 14th century.

The version of the banner of Elbląg with square crosses, used in 1410 during the Battle of Grunwald.

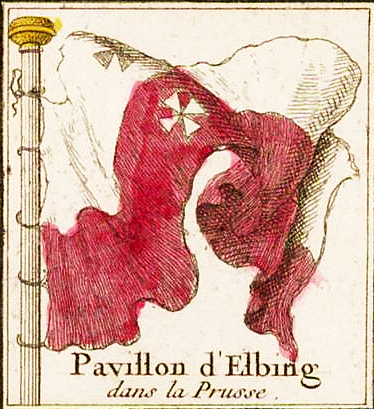
Flag of Elbląg from Jacques-Nicolas Bellin flag cart, presented among the important nautical flags of the 18th century.

In 14th century, the city of Elbląg, as part of its allegiance to the Hanseatic League, begun using the banner that was horizontally divided into two fields, that were red and white, with each of the fields containing a cross pattée, that was of the opposite colour to the fields. Such flag was flown on the cogs of the Hanseatic League. The red and white colours were inspired by the banner of the city of Lübeck, used since 13th century.

On 15 July 1410, during the Battle of Grunwald, the soldiers from Elbląg flew two versions of the banner, with one using the crosses pattée, and other, the square crosses.

The city adopted the current version of the flag in 1993. Its design was based on the 14th century banner.
