= St. Nicholas Cathedral, Elbląg =

Church building in Elblag, Poland

Coordinates: 54°09′30″N 19°23′42″E

St. Nicholas Cathedral Katedra św. Mikołaja w Elblągu (in Polish)
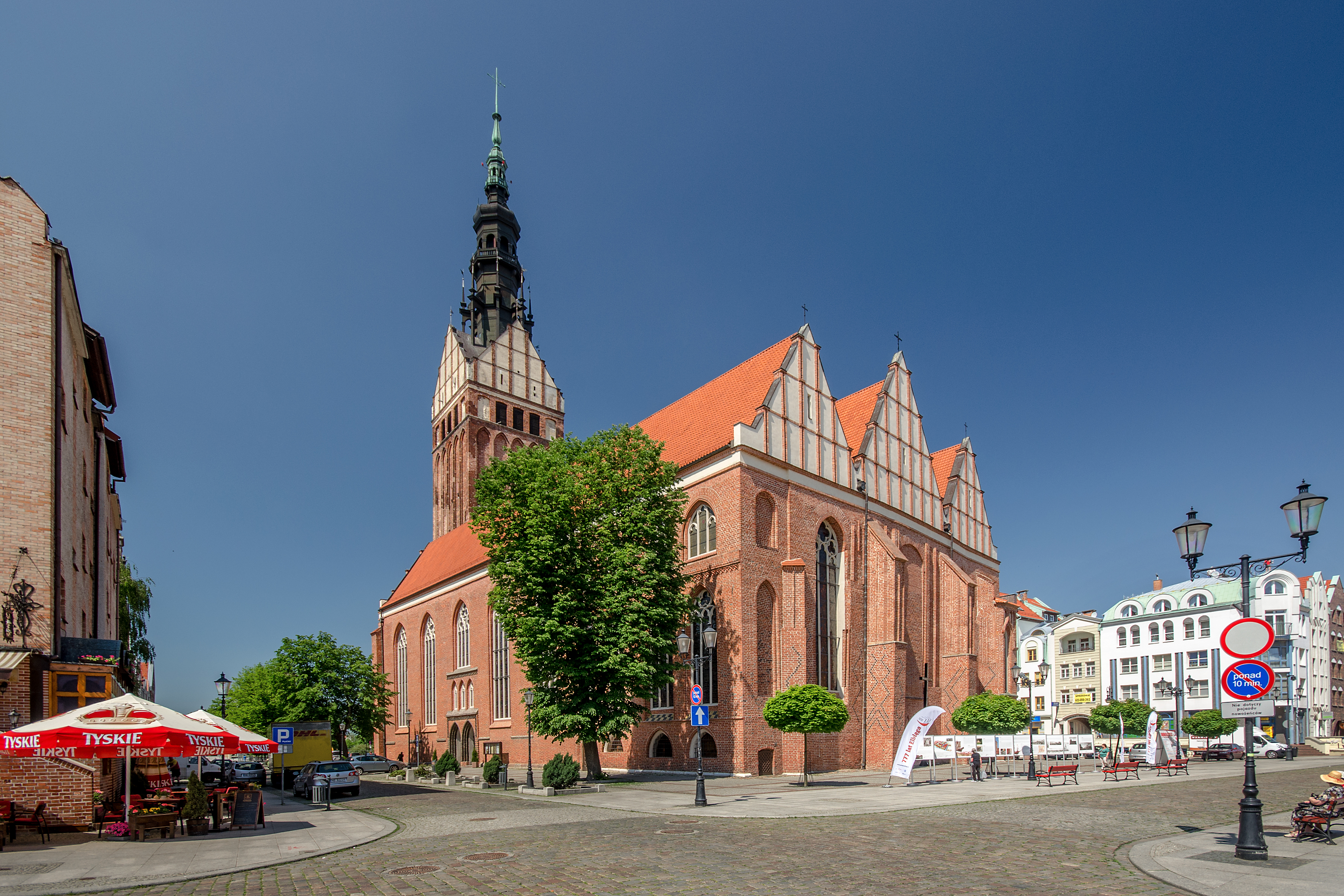

Religion
- Affiliation: Roman Catholic
- Diocese: Old Town
- Province: Warmia

Location
- Location: Elbląg, Poland
- Interactive map of St. Nicholas Cathedral; Katedra św. Mikołaja w Elblągu (in Polish)

Architecture
- Style: Brick Gothic
- Completed: c. 1247
- Materials: Brick

St. Nicholas Cathedral is a 13th-century Gothic church in Elbląg, Poland. Established in c. 1247, the church became Lutheran in 1573. It was damaged by fire in the late 18th century and suffered damage during World War II. It was elevated to the status of cathedral in 1992.

== History ==
In 1573 the church was taken over by Lutherans. In the following years, the bishops of Warmia made efforts to reclaim the church for Catholics, which only succeeded on the basis of a settlement between Bishop Szymon Rudnicki and the city council of Elbląg in 1616.

St. Nicholas was damaged by fire in the late 18th century, then destroyed in World War II and reconstructed. In 1992, the building was elevated to the status of cathedral.
