= Paul Pulewka =

Paul Pulewka (11 February 1896 – 22 October 1989) was a German pharmacologist from Elbing (Elbląg).

== Early life ==
Pulewka graduated from the Königsberg Medical Faculty in 1923 and earned doctorates in pharmacology and toxicology from the Pharmacology Institute of the same university in 1927.

== Career ==
Pulewka was appointed Docent at the University of Tübingen in 1929. In May 1933, he was promoted to Professor Extraordinarius of Pharmacology and Toxicology at Tübingen where he lectured on the toxicology of poisonous gases and the protection against them. He was elected to the university's Senate. However, Behrend Behrens, Pulewka's former assistant whom he and his wife had once saved from drowning in a sea accident, warned Pulewka that he was in serious danger from the Nazi Party because of his political beliefs and because his wife was Jewish.

Pulewka resigned, or was released, from his professorship of pharmacy at the University of Tübingen, and with help of an anti-Nazi official in the German foreign ministry, the Pulewkas found their way to Turkey in October 1935. At first, he worked for the Central Hygiene (Public Health) Institute of the Ministry of Health in Ankara. His contract was not renewed in 1940 and he stayed, jobless, in Turkey for almost a year when he was rehired, and, in 1946, Pulewka became Director of the Pharmacy Institute at the University of Ankara, where he became a leader in establishing pharmacological controls. He worked there until 1954, at which time he returned to Germany. He died in Tübingen.
