= Marcin Klemensowski =

Polish military officer

Marcin Klemensowski of Gozdawa (c. 1791-1869) was a Polish military officer and a Colonel of the Polish Army. During the November Uprising he served as the quartermaster general of the Polish Army. After the fall of the uprising he withdrew from the military and settled in the manor of Celejów near Puławy. He died 15 February 1869 and is buried at Warsaw's Powązki Cemetery.
