= Maximilian Consbruch =

German teacher and classical philologist (1866-1927)

- Born: Maximilian Friedrich Julius Consbruch; 20 June 1866; Elbing, West Prussia, Kingdom of Prussia
- Died: 14 August 1927 (aged 61); Elbing, Weimar Germany
- Citizenship: German Empire
- Education: Berlin-Brandenburg Academy of Sciences and Humanities
- Occupations: Educator, linguist, editor
- Writing career
- Pen name: Max Consbruch
- Language: German, Ancient Greek
- Years active: 1892–1927
- Period: Belle Époque
- Genre: Classical philology
- Subject: Greek lyric
- Notable works: Hephaestionis enchiridion, Leipzig 1906

Maximilian Friedrich Julius Consbruch (20 June 1866 – 14 August 1927) was a German West Prussian classical philologist and gymnasium principal, known for his studies of Greek lyric and the work of Hephaestion.

Consbruch was the son of a German-speaking Prussian parson and born in Elbing, West Prussia, Kingdom of Prussia (present-day Poland). He studied classical philology and theology at the Day Gymnasium in Elbing, then until 1884 in Berlin, then until 1885 in Breslau. He spent time assigned to the Berlin-Brandenburg Academy of Sciences and Humanities, working on Greek etymology and spending some months in Italy. Afterwards he lived in Halle (Saale) and taught there from 1892-1894 at the Latin High School of the Francke Foundation, then from 1894-1909 at the local City Gymnasium, and from 1902-1909 he was simultaneously an assistant lecturer in philology at the University of Halle. From 1909-1911 he was director of the Carl-Frederick-Gymnasium Eisenach, now the Martin-Luther-Gymnasium Eisenach. From 1911-1914 he was director of the Gymnasium of Saint Mary Magdalene Gymnasium Breslau, a German-language school that is now a Polish lyceum. His subsequent positions were as a teacher operating in the area of ancient philological research and as a writer of articles for Pauly's Realencyclopädie der Classischen Altertumswissenschaft.

== Works ==
- De Hephaestioneis qui circumferuntur peri poiēmatos commentariis, Dissertation, Breslau 1889
- De veterum peri poiēmatos doctrina: acc. commentarii qui circumferuntur peri poiēmatos, Breslau 1890
- Hephaestionis enchiridion, Leipzig 1906
- Deutsche Lyrik des 19. Jahrhunderts, Leipzig 1909
