= Weyher family =

Former noble family

Coat of Arms of the Weyher family

Weyher family (alternative spellings: Wejher, Weiher, Waier, Weier, sometimes spelled Weiger Polish: Weyherowie) was a family of high nobility, most prominent in the 16th and 17th centuries in the Pomerania region and the Polish–Lithuanian Commonwealth. The family origins can be traced to Würzburg, Germany.

== Prominent members ==
- Klaus Weiher, of the noble von Weyher family going back in Pomerania to Dietrich von Weiher (aka Theodericus Weyher). Claus was the founder of the Polish line of the Weyher family members of which later on held many offices in the Polish–Lithuanian Commonwealth
- Martin Weiher (1512–1556), son of Klaus Weiher and Sophie von Ramel, the second Lutheran bishop of Cammin
- Ernest Wejher (1517–1598), voivode of Chełmno, starost of Puck
- Jan Wejher (1580–1626), son of Ernest Wejher and Anna Mortęska, starost of Puck
- Melchior Wejher (1574–1643), son of Ernest Wejher and Anna Mortęska, econom of Malbork, castellan of Elbląg and voivode of Chełmno
- Mikołaj Wejher (?-1647), son of Jan Wejher and Anna Szczawińska, voivode of Malbork (since 1641) and voivode of Chełmno (since 1643), starost of Radzyń Chełmiński and of Kowalewo Pomorskie
- Ludwik Wejher (?-1656), son of Jan Wejher and Anna Szczawińska, colonel of the Polish army (since 1647). He was the commander of the defence of Zamość in 1648 and later of Malbork in 1656. He was also castellan of Elbląg, Voivod of Pomerania and starost of Wałcz
- Jakub Wejher (Jacob Weiher) (1609 – 1657), son of Jan Wejher and Anna Szczawińska. Jakub was voivode of Malbork and a founder of town of Weihersfrei, Weyhersfrey, Neustadt (Wejherowo)
- Ludwig von Weyher owner of Gut Langfuhr, received advise in 1771 and in book by Samuel Luther von Geret of Thorn
