= Jakub Wejher =

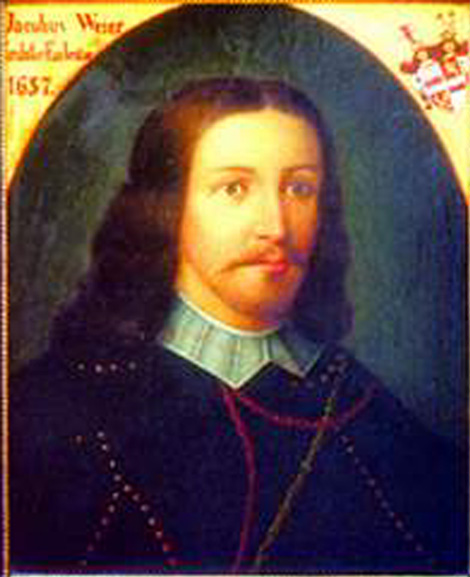
Jakub Wejher

Jakub Wejher (or Weyher, German: Jakob Weiher) (1609 – 1657), was a member of the Polish line of the Weyher family, a Count of the Holy Roman Empire and member of the Polish–Lithuanian Commonwealth szlachta (nobility). His coat of arms was Wejher (also known as Skarzyna). Wejher was the Castellan of Puck and Voivode of Malbork (Marienburg) from 1643–1657, the Castellan of Chmielno, and the Starost of Człuchów, Kiszporek, Bychów and Brzechowo. He is remembered as a pious and tolerant magnate and an experienced military leader.

== Biography ==
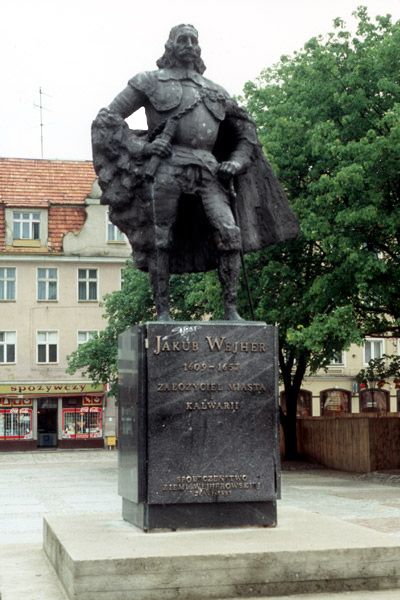
Monument of Jakub Weiher, Wejherowo.

Weiher was one of eight sons of Jan Wejher (1580–1626) and Anna Szczawińska, and brother of Mikołaj Wejher (?–1647) and Ludwik Wejher (?–1656).

He was a member of a rich magnate family originating from Westphalia, some of whom had moved to Farther Pomerania where they have been recorded since 1234. Martin Weyher was a Lutheran Bishop of Kamień (Cammin). From the first half of the 16th century members of the family started to hold many offices in the Kingdom of Poland and later on in the Polish–Lithuanian Commonwealth. They intermarried into Polish nobility and became its prominent members. Jakub became a courtier of prince Władysław IV Vasa. He studied first at a Jesuit College in Braniewo, Royal Prussia, a province of the Polish–Lithuanian Commonwealth, then abroad at the University of Bologna. He was a Catholic and a supporter of the Counter-Reformation. Pursuing traditions of his family, as a youth he joined foreign military. In the years 1628-1632 he fought in the Thirty Years' War in the Holy Roman Empire in the armies of the Catholic League, commanding a cavalry unit under Albrecht von Wallenstein. At some point he visited Malta. For his valor he received the title count of the Holy Roman Empire (in 1636).

In 1632 he returned to Poland. As part of Poland's royal army he fought in the Smolensk War (1633–1634), The Deluge, Russo-Polish War (1654–67) and the Chmielnicki Uprising. During the Deluge - the Swedish invasion of Poland - unlike many commanders in the north of Poland, he did not switch sides and defect to the Swedes. Instead he defended Malbork for two months before capitulating. He was able to obtain from the Swedes a safe passage of his troops which retained their arms; he would soon join the Polish king in the south and would continue to fight the invaders.

For his services he was awarded by the king and Sejm (parliament) with several offices: Voivode of Malbork (1643–1657). Castellan of Chmielno. Starost of Człuchów, Kiszporek, Bychów and Brzechowo. In his later years he ruled about 100 villages and five towns, and had an income of about 33,000 zlotys. This made him one of the richest people in Pomerania and a notable magnate in contemporary Poland.

He supervised the construction of Władysławowo, a fledging port for the Polish–Lithuanian Commonwealth Navy. He founded the town of Wejherowo and in it, the Kalwaria Wejherowska chapel complex (fulfilling an oath he took when he nearly died during the Smolensk War at Biała in 1634). Over the years he founded several other monasteries, churches, as well as secular settlements. Despite being an ardent Catholic, Wejher proved to be a tolerant ruler, and supported peaceful dealings with the Protestants.

He was married twice: once in 1636 to Anna Elżbieta Schaffgotsch and then in 1652 to Joanna Katarzyna Radziwiłł of the Radziwiłł family. He had three daughters (two with Anna and one with Joanna). He was buried in St. Ann Church in Wejherowo.

== Bibliography and external links ==
- (in Polish) Biography Jakub Wejher (1643-1657), a page sponsored by Wejherowo city council
- (in Polish) Another biography Jakub Wejher
- (in Polish) Jerzy Więckowiak, Jakub Wejher (1609-1657) – fundator i magnat pomorski, POMERANIA 1/1981
