= Battle of Lubrze =

Military engagement of the Deluge in Greater Poland

Coordinates: 52°5′43″N 17°23′21″E

- Part of the Deluge
Date	August 28, 1656
Location	Lubrze, Greater Poland
Result	Polish–Lithuanian victory

Belligerents
Polish–Lithuanian Commonwealth	(Swedish Empire) Sweden; Brandenburg

Commanders and leaders
Andrzej Karol Grudziński	(Swedish Empire) Jan Wejhard Wrzesowicz †

Strength
Between 200 and 500	Between 800 and 2,000

Casualties and losses
	Between 500 and 800 killed

The Battle of Lubrze was a night battle which took place during the Deluge (part of the Second Northern War) in August 1656 between Polish forces under voivode of Kalisz Andrzej Karol Grudziński and a Swedish-Brandenburg force under Jan Wejhard von Wrzesowicz. The Swedish-Brandenburg forces were coming to provide relief to the besieged town of Kalisz, invested by a Polish army under voivode of Malbork Jakub Wejher, brother of Ludwik Wejher.

A small Polish force (between 200 and 500 men) surprised a weakly guarded Swedish-Brandenburg cavalry camp at Lubrze in Greater Poland, near Śrem and Środa Wielkopolska, and 47 km south-east of the voivodeship capital of Poznań.

According to Pierre des Noyers who was a secretary to Her Majesty Polish Queen Marie Louise Gonzaga, in his letter dated September 17, 1656, Andrzej Karol Grudziński, commanding a host of 300 noblemen, was told by the local peasants about a small Swedish command of 200 men in the village of Lubrze. He decided to attack them at night, in a surprise nocturnal action. First, the Poles annihilated the 60 strong night guards and then attacked the remainder of the enemy's command. The swiftness and confusion of the night attack disallowed the Swedes and Brandenburgers to mount their horses. Throughout the night, fighting Polish soldiers decimated the Swedish-Brandenburg division (source vary from 800 to 2000 strong), both in the village and on the banks of a small stream where the defenders took flight. They killed about 500 to 800 officers and their men (entire command of 800 officers and men according to des Noyers), taking many prisoners including a Prussian colonel and his trumpeter. The Swedish commander, Jan Wejhard von Wrzesowicz, was killed by the peasants while in flight from the battlefield. Since he was particularly hated by the local populace, his body was left unburied for many days.

According to Wawrzyniec Jan Rudawski, a Polish period chronicler, the battle took place on the night of August 28, 1656. Rudawski states that the Swedes suffered following losses in officers: Majors Peter, Jan Otto de Walh, Hejder from the Saxon regiment. Majors Moritz, Frydryk Gros (or Gross), Teyeh from the General Walch's regiment, Rotameister Weinland of the Nachtigall regiment; and the important Swedish administrative Poznań official Kasper Fruchtland.

Rudawski gave the following officer losses suffered by the Elector of Brandenburg/Prussia army: Major of Pfuhl's regiment Andreas Pauli, Rotameister of general Dorfling's regiment Peter Saks, Rotameister of count de Wilgenstein's regiment Baron Schwende, Rotameister Bretlar, Colonel acting as general major de Kanneberg, Commissar Godfryd Weiter.

This Polish victory caused serious disruption for the Swedish hold on Central Poland. It forced the nominal possessor of Greater Poland, the Prussian-Brandenburg Elector, to reroute a sizable Prussian division under Derflinger, also marching towards Kalisz, to withdraw north to Toruń, after leaving commands at Poznań and Miedzyrzecz. Devoid of any hope of the relief forces, the besieged Swedish garrison of Kalisz surrendered to the Polish army on November 8, 1656.

== Bibliography ==
- Wawrzyniec Jan Rudawski, Historja Polska od śmierci Władysława IV aż do pokoju Oliwskiego, czyli dzieje panowania Jana Kazimierza od 1648 do 1660 r (Polish History from the Death of Władysław IV Vasa until the Treaty of Oliva, or the story of Jan II Casimir's rule from 1648 to 1660s), Volume 2, Saint Petersburg and Mogilev, Wolff Publishing, 1855. p. 153-154.
- Pierre des Noyers, Lettres de Pierre Des Noyers secrétaire de la reine de Pologne Marie-Louise de Gonzague ... pour servir a l'histoire de Pologne et de Suède de 1655 a 1659, Librarie de Behr, Berlin 1859.
- Patrick Gordon, Diary of General Patrick Gordon of Auchleuchries 1635–1699, vol 1., ed. Dmitry Fedosov, Aberdeen, 2009.
