= Jan Działyński (voivode, born 1590) =

Polish-Lithuanian noble

Jan Działyński (1590–1648) of Gozdawa coat of arms was a Polish–Lithuanian Commonwealth noble and politician. He was a member of the Działyński family. He was a starost of Pokrzywno, Puck, and Kowalewo Pomorskie, and Voivode of Chełmno from 1647 to 1648.

He was a deputy to Sejm, a notable politician from Royal Prussia. He was a critic of Gdańsk, defender of Catholic faith, and founder of the collegium in Grudziądz. He is known to have been engaged in several court proceedings with various other nobles and even peasants.

He married twice and had no children.
