= Partition of Prussia =

1466 division of Prussia

The Partition of Prussia (German: Teilung Preußens) in 1466 was the territorial settlement established by the Second Peace of Thorn, which ended the Thirteen Years' War (1454–1466) between the Prussian Confederation and the Kingdom of Poland on one side and the Teutonic Order on the other. Under the treaty, the western part of the Teutonic State – including the Hanseatic cities of Danzig (Gdańsk), Elbing (Elbląg), and Thorn (Toruń), as well as the Prince-Bishopric of Ermland (Warmia) – became Royal Prussia, an autonomous province of the Polish Crown. The remaining eastern territories continued as the State of the Teutonic Order, but were held in fief from the Polish king.

Despite the partition, a shared Prussian identity rooted in common legal traditions, language, and historical heritage persisted. Although Royal Prussia became increasingly integrated with the Polish Crown while retaining broad autonomy, both parts continued to maintain close political, cultural, and institutional ties, with a distinct Prussian identity enduring alongside German and Polish influences.

== Overview ==
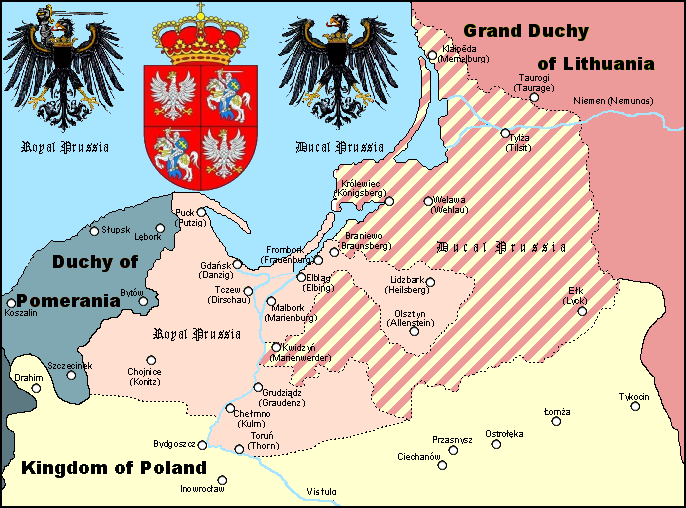
Map showing Royal Prussia and Ducal Prussia

A specific Prussian national consciousness became notable in works on local historiography by the end of the 14th century. Different from chronicles of the Teutonic Order, the historiography now related to the country. Although often sympathetic to the Order, the works show a sense of regional identity. Regardless of whether they were in opposition to the Teutonic Order, historians now portray the country. However, in 1466, the Second Peace of Thorn divided Prussia into two parts without regard for local conditions. While the western territories became Royal Prussia under the Polish Crown, the eastern territories remained under the rule of the Teutonic Order. In 1525, the Teutonic State was secularised as the Duchy of Prussia, which remained a Polish fief until the Treaties of Wehlau and Bromberg in 1657.

For Royal Prussia, Karin Friedrich has described a Prussian identity, which was not shaped by nationality but by political concepts which were seen compatible with political ideals of the Polish Rzeczpospolita. Many commonalities between Royal Prussia and Ducal Prussia continued to exist. The diets of Ducal Prussia and Royal Prussia met separately, but those of Royal Prussia often welcomed ambassadors from the Duchy. Efforts continued to a common mint, and a common defense, which, when realized, would have furthered commonality between the country parts. Also, a common revision of the Kulm law was strived for, but even though both King Sigismund and duke Albert intervened, a separate Landrecht for the Duchy was created in 1620. The Estates of Royal Prussia increasingly had to deal with Polish affairs, and the preservation of the German language and the status of Poles as foreigners were frequent topics of discussion.

In both country parts, a remarkable relation between Prussian and German emerged. At the beginning of the 16th century, monk Simon Grunau of Tolkemit recorded on the population of Natangia that Prussians speaking the Old Prussian language lived along with Prussians who spoke German. In the first half of the 16th century, historians write of a new-Prussian nation (narodowość nowopruska) with continuing traditions in both parts of Prussia.

The sense of identity in Royal Prussia was complicated because depending on circumstance, Ducal Prussia was seen as part of the country, as a closely related twin-country, or as a separated part of the country. In general, local elites, mostly German-speaking, saw that their autonomy was better served by attachment to the Polish king rather than by rule by a German duke. Depending on status in society, the Duchy was seen as a closely related member of a double country. Consciousness of citizens was supranational and many people were bilingual, German being the country's language while Polish was used at diets and by nobility.

Thereafter, the middle ranks of the nobility became increasingly oriented towards Poland, while the townspeople continued to advocate political autonomy from Poland. Historians have observed, however, that assimilation into the Polish–Lithuanian Commonwealth did not increase further after the period 1690–1730. The urban elites, particularly in the 1560s and 1570s, firmly upheld political autonomy. During the first half of the 16th century, Prussian national consciousness developed under the influence of the Duchy while also drawing on traditions dating back to the Teutonic Order. The lower nobility was less involved in this consciousness. Acculturation to the Polish–Lithuanian Commonwealth ceased between 1690 and 1730, partly as a result of events such as the Tumult of Thorn (Toruń). The appeal of Polish noble culture also declined with the spread of higher education and the early Enlightenment. This historical development is not well reflected in Polish historiography, which often adopts a broader conception of Pomorze stretching from Szczecin to Klaipėda, placing less emphasis on the region's distinct pre-1945 historical identity.

Later, reunification of these two separated Old Prussian parts of the country was an opportunity for Frederick II the Great in 1773 to name the western part of the country West Prussia, while East Prussia referred to the eastern part of the country.

== Bibliography ==
- Jähnig, Bernhard [in German] (1995). "Entstehen und Schicksal des Neustamms der Preußen aus Deutschen, Balten und Slaven vom 13. bis zum 20. Jahrhundert". Tausend Jahre Nachbarschaft: die Völker des baltischen Raumes und die Deutschen. Bruckmann. pp. 185–198.
- Jagodzinsk, Sabine (2024). Prussiae suae bis pater: Adlige Repräsentationskulturen in beiden Teilen Preußens (17./18. Jh.). Harrassowitz Verlag. ISBN 978-3-447-12074-6.
- Bömelburg, Hans-Jürgen [in German] (2005). Sabine Beckmann; Klaus Garber (eds.). Das Landesbewußtsein im Preußen königlich polnischen Anteils in der Frühen Neuzeit.
