= Melchior Weiher =

Polish noble (1574–1643)

Melchior Weiher (1574–1643) was a Polish noble.

Weiher was the son of Ernest Weiher. Weiher held several important offices in the Polish–Lithuanian Commonwealth. He was the Deputy Treasury of Royal Prussia and economy of Malbork from 1616 to 1624, castellan of Elbląg from 1619 to 1635, and voivode of Chełmno from 1626 (until death). Starost of Tczew, Nowy Dwór Gdański, Wałcz, Człuchów, Kowalewo Pomorskie and prefect of Lębork and Bytów, he was a controversial figure in social life, known for his dislike of women and likely homosexual tendencies.
