= Jan Działyński =

Jan Działyński may refer to:

- Jan Działyński (stolnik, born 1489) (1489–1587), Polish nobleman, stolnik of Dobrzyń, castellan of Słońsk
- Jan Działyński (voivode, born 1510) (1510–1583), Polish nobleman, voivode of Chełm, chamberlain of Gdańsk, Elbląg and Chełm
- Jan Działyński (voivode, born 1590) (1590–1648), Polish nobleman, voivode of Chełm, starosta of Puck
- Paweł Jan Działyński (1594–1643), Polish nobleman, voivode of Pomorze
- Jan Kanty Działyński (1829–1880), Polish social and political activist
