= Lubrze =

- Village
- Location within Poland
- Coordinates: 52°5′43″N 17°23′21″E
- Country: Poland
- Voivodeship: Greater Poland
- County: Środa
- Gmina: Krzykosy
- Population: 90

Lubrze [ˈlubʐɛ] is a village in the administrative district of Gmina Krzykosy, within Środa County, Greater Poland Voivodeship, in west-central Poland. This village was the site of the battle of Lubrze in 1656, during the Second Northern War or the Deluge.
