= Jan Wejher =

Polish noble (1580–1626)

Jan Wejher (1580–1626) was a Polish nobleman, son of Ernest Wejher and Anna Mortęska. He held many offices and was an officer of the army in the Polish–Lithuanian Commonwealth and a courtier of the Polish king Sigismund III from the age of thirteen.

== Military service and political activity ==
Wejher accompanied the King in his campaign to crush the rebellion of Duke Charles in Sweden. He fought in the victorious Battle of Stegeborg and was wounded in the Battle of Stångebro. He helped defend Gdańsk from the Swedes in their raids in the early 17th century. From 1609 he was engaged in the Polish–Muscovite War.

He was a Voivode of Malbork and Chełmno.

== Personal life ==
Wejher married to Anna Szczawińska, the daughter of the starost of Mirachowo; they had five sons and three daughters:

Sons:

- Jakub Wejher
- Ludwik Wejher
- Jan Wejher (the younger)
- Karol Wejher
- Mikołaj Wejher

Daughters:

- Zofia Potulicka
- Elżbieta Massalska
- Zuzanna Wejher (entered a monastery)
