= Ius indigenatus =

Former legal right in Prussia

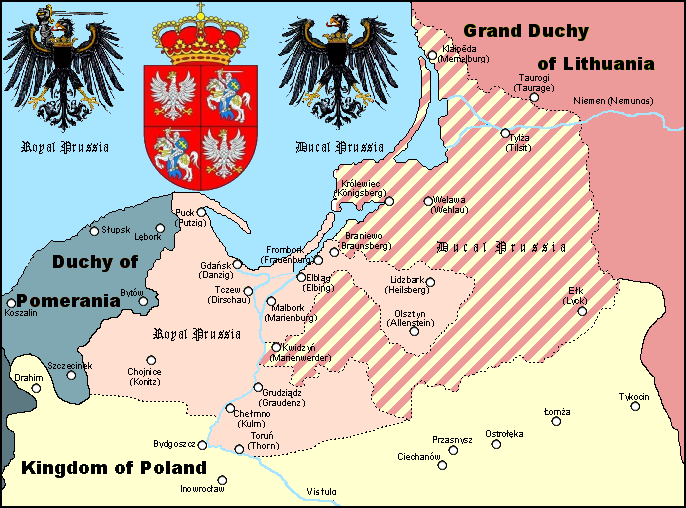
Historical region of Prussia, after 1466 separated into Royal Prussia and Ducal Prussia (striped)

Ius indigenatus (Latin for "right of local birth") is a right which was from the 15th to the 18th century a requirement for people to hold royal office in Royal Prussia, a Polish province. It limited offices and land ownership to local Prussian natives.

It was confirmed in 1466 by the Second Peace of Thorn which secured a large decree of autonomy for Royal Prussia. The Prussian Ius indigenatus was valid for both parts of Prussia separated in 1466, the western part, later called Royal Prussia, and the eastern part, from 1525 the Duchy of Prussia, later East Prussia.

== See also ==
- Jus soli
- Jus sanguinis
- Indygenat
