= Statue of Jakub Weiher =

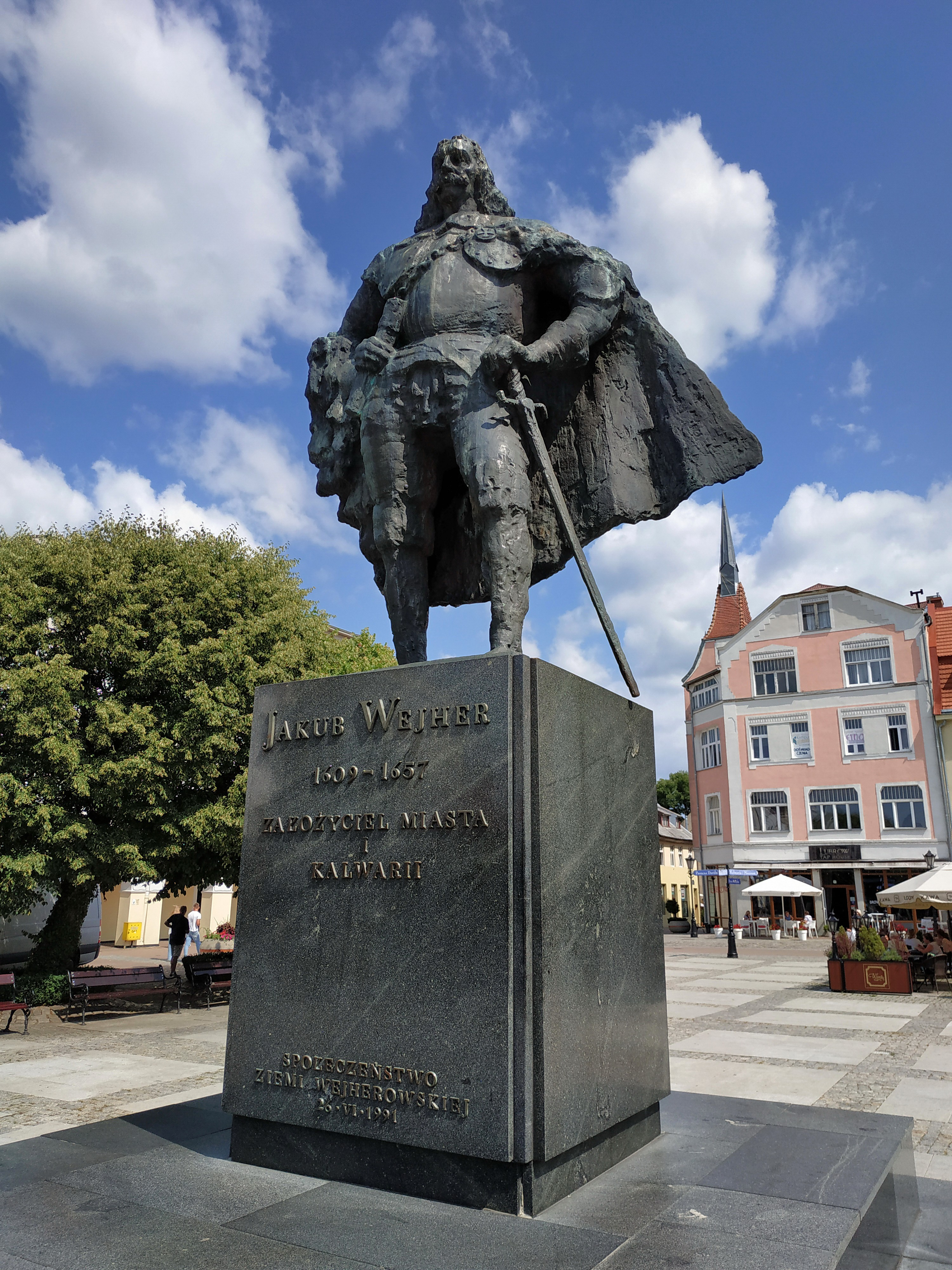
- Monument of Jakub Weiher in 2021
- Interactive map of Statue of Jakub Weiher
- Location: Jakub Weiher Square, Wejherowo
- Coordinates: 54°36′06″N 18°14′22″E
- Type: Statue
- Completion date: 1991

The statue of Jakub Weiher (Polish: Pomnik Jakuba Weihera) is a monument in Wejherowo, Poland depicting the city founder, Jakub Weiher. It is located at the Jakub Weiher Square.

== History ==
=== Creation ===
In 1982, the Monument of Jakub Weiher Social Committee was founded with the goal of raising the founds to build the monument. The monument was completed in 1991.

=== Similarity to Darth Vader ===
On various occasions the statue would be dressed as various characters, including Santa Claus during a holiday season.

On 23 January 2016, a local newspaper, Wejherowo.pl, shared a photo of the monument covered in snow, which made it look to Darth Vader, a fictional character from the Star Wars franchise and the primary antagonist in the original trilogy. The picture had received over 2,000 likes and nearly 1,000 shares. About the picture wrote foreign media, including Time.

The next year, on 16 December 2017, the city had dressed the monument as a Darth Vader for the Forcecon 2017, a second convention of the Star Wars fans that took place in the city. For that occasion, the city had given the monument a replica of the lightsaber, helmet, cape and other decorations.

In 7 December 2020, a councilman of the city council of Kraków, Poland, Łukasz Wantuch, proposed to build a monument of Darth Vader in the district of Nowa Huta, as a tourist magnet. He argued his decision with the publicity that the monument of Jakub Weiher got.
