= Malbork Voivodeship =

Voivodeship of the Kingdom of Poland (1466–1772)

Malbork Voivodeship Marienburg Voivodeship Województwo malborskie Woiwodschaft Marienburg Palatinatus Marienburgensis
- Voivodeship of Poland¹; Part of Royal Prussia and Greater Poland provinces
- 1466–1772
- Coat of arms

- Malbork Voivodeship of the Polish–Lithuanian Commonwealth
- Capital: Malbork
- Area
  - Coordinates: 54°02′21″N 19°01′39″E
- 2,096 km^{2} (809 sq mi)
- History
  - Prussian uprising: 1454
  - 2nd Peace of Thorn: 9 October 1466
  - Union of Lublin: 1569
  - 1st Polish partition: 1772
- Political subdivisions: Counties: 4
Preceded by	Succeeded by
State of the Teutonic Order; Elbląg Voivodeship	West Prussia
- Today part of: Poland
- ¹ Voivodeship of the Polish Crown in the Polish–Lithuanian Commonwealth; Voivodeship of the Kingdom of Poland before 1569.

The Malbork Voivodeship (Polish: Województwo malborskie) or Marienburg Voivodeship (German: Woiwodschaft Marienburg; Latin: Palatinatus Marienburgensis), was a unit of administrative division and local government in the Kingdom of Poland from 1454/1466 until the Partitions of Poland in 1772–1795. Its capital was at Marienburg (Malbork).

Together with the Pomeranian and Chełmno Voivodeships and the Prince-Bishopric of Warmia it formed the historical province of Royal Prussia, and with several more voivodeships it formed part of the Greater Poland Province.

== History ==
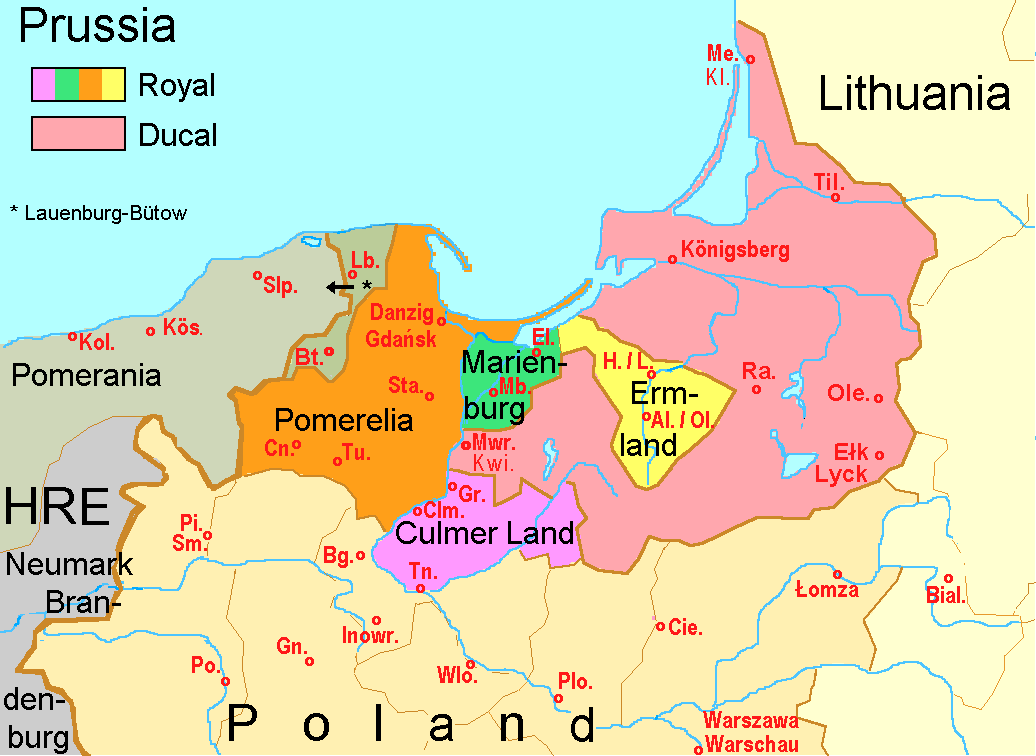
Province of Royal Prussia in 1525 Malbork Voivodeship (Marienburg)

After the Teutonic Knights during the 13th century had conquered the Prussian territories and incorporated them into the Order's State, the castle of Marienburg served as the seat of the Grand Masters of the Teutonic Knights. Following the 1410 Battle of Grunwald, the Knights once again could withstand the Polish Siege of Marienburg. In 1440, various cities, towns and nobles from the area co-formed the anti-Teutonic Prussian Confederation. In 1454, the organisation led an uprising against the rule of the Teutonic Knights, and asked King Casimir IV of Poland to include the region within the Kingdom of Poland, to which the King agreed and signed the act of incorporation of the region to Poland in March 1454 in Kraków, which sparked the Thirteen Years' War. The cities of Elbing (Elbląg), Marienburg (Malbork), Stuhm (Sztum) and Tolkemit (Tolkmicko) were members of the Confederation, whereas Christburg (Kiszpork/Dzierzgoń) also sided with Poland in the war. The Teutonic Knights had to withdraw from Marienburg to Königsberg and after their final defeat lost the castle and the surrounding territory in the 1466 Second Peace of Thorn.

King Casimir IV Jagiellon of Poland established the Malbork Voivodeship, including the towns of Elbing, Stuhm and Christburg. Since the 1569 Union of Lublin the Lands of the Polish Crown were part of the larger Polish–Lithuanian Commonwealth. Malbork Castle was occupied twice by troops of the Swedish Empire: during the Thirty Years' War 1626–1629 and again from 1656 to 1660 during the Deluge. Truces between Poland and Sweden were signed in the Malbork Voivodeship in 1629 and 1635.

In 1772, the voivodeship was annexed by the Kingdom of Prussia in the First Partition of Poland and became part of the newly established Province of West Prussia the next year.

Zygmunt Gloger in his monumental book Historical Geography of the Lands of Old Poland provides this description of Malbork Voivodeship:

"The smallest of three voivodeships of Polish Prussia, it was divided into four counties: Sztum, Kiszpork, Elbląg and Malbork. Local starostas resided at Kiszpork, Sztum, Tolkmicko, and other locations. Sejmiks and courts were not located at Malbork, but at Sztum, which itself was governed by the starosta of Kiszpork. At sejmiks, local nobility elected eight deputies to the Prussian Sejm, e.g. two from each county (...) Malbork Voivodeship’s coat of arms was almost identical as Chełmno Voivodeship's, with differences in color of the eagle. The Prussian Sejm took place alternatively at Malbork and Grudziądz".

== Cities ==
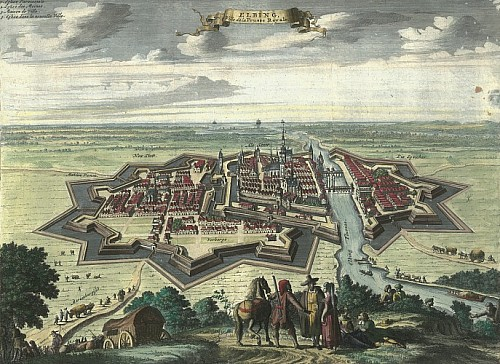
Elbing (Elbląg), the largest city of the voivodeship, in the 18th century

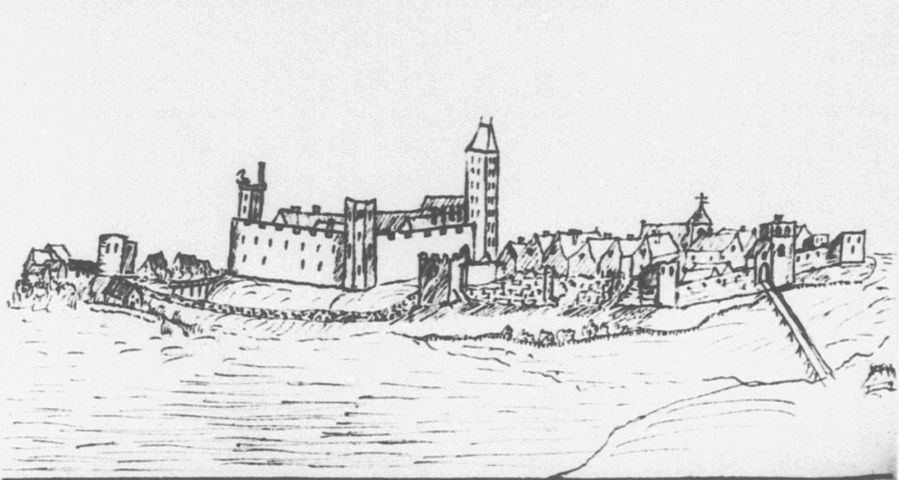
Stuhm (Sztum), royal town and county seat, mid-18th century drawing

The largest city of the voivodeship was Elbing (Elbląg), which as one of the largest and most influential cities of entire Poland enjoyed voting rights during the royal free elections. Other cities were Marienburg (Malbork), Stuhm (Sztum), Christburg (Kiszpork/Dzierzgoń), and Tolkemit (Tolkmicko), and all cities in the voivodeship were royal cities in Poland.

== Administration ==
Voivodeship Governor (Wojewoda) seat:

- Malbork

Voivodes list:

- Ścibor Bażyński/Stibor (Tiburcius) von Baysen 15 June 1467 – 1480
- Mikołaj Bażyński/Niklas von Baysen 23 February 1481 – 27 March 1501
- Maciej Raba 21 August 1512 – 1546
- Achacy Czema 1546 – 24 May 1564
- Fabian Czema 1566–1580
- Fabian Czema (younger) 1581-22 August 1605
- Jerzy Kostka 1605–1611
- Stanisław Działyński 1611–1615
- Jan Wejher 1615–1618
- Stanisław Konarski 1618–1625
- Samuel Żaliński 3 November 1625 – 6 October 1629
- Samuel Konarski 30 November 1629 – 1641
- Mikołaj Wejher 11 October 1641 – 20 May 1643
- Jakub Wejher 20 May 1643 – 21 February 1657
- Stanisław Działyński 30 March 1657 – 1677
- Jan Ignacy Bąkowski 1677–1679
- Jan Gniński 1679
- Franciszek Jan Bieliński 1681–1685
- Ernest Denhoff 1685–1693
- Władysław Łoś 1694
- Jan Jerzy Przebendowski 17 September 1697 – 9 February 1703
- Piotr Kczewski 9 February 1703 – 20 November 1722
- Piotr Przebendowski 21 November 1722 – 1755
- Jakub Działyński 27 May 1756 – 17 September 1772

Regional council (sejmik generalny):

- Sztum

The Voivodeship was divided into four powiats (counties or administrative divisions):

- Sztum County, (Powiat Sztumski),
- Kiszpork County, (Powiat Kiszporski),
- Elbląg County, (Powiat Elbląski),
- Malbork County, (Powiat Malborski).

== Sources ==
- Malbork Voivodeship, description by Zygmunt Gloger

== Bibliography ==
- Górski, Karol (1949). Związek Pruski i poddanie się Prus Polsce: zbiór tekstów źródłowych (in Polish). Poznań: Instytut Zachodni.
