= Karin Friedrich =

German historian

Karin Friedrich (born 12 June 1963, in Munich) is a German historian, a professor in history at the University of Aberdeen King's College.

Friedrich received an M.A. in history and political science from LMU Munich in 1989 and a Ph.D. in history from Georgetown University in 1995. From 1995 to 2004, she worked as a lecturer and senior lecturer at the School of Slavonic and East European Studies, University of London/University College London. From 2001 to 2006, she was co-editor of the academic journal German History. At Aberdeen she is co-director of the Centre for Early Modern Studies. She is also member of several editorial boards (see links below).

Specialising in Polish, German and Prussian history, she wrote The Other Prussia. Royal Prussia, Poland and Liberty, 1569–1772, shedding light on the history of the Western part of Prussia in which German-speaking Protestants were subject to the elected King of the Polish–Lithuanian Commonwealth.

She also stayed at the Free University of Berlin in 2000, gained a Leverhulme Research Fellowship, and several guest scholarships (University of Greifswald, at the Herzog August Library, Wolfenbüttel), an AHRC fellowship (2011), and served as advisory committee member of the German Historical Institute in Warsaw and as member of the Working Group on the Baroque, Herzog August Library, Wolfenbüttel. She was recently elected member of the Council of the Royal Historical Society, London.

== Work (selection) ==
- The Other Prussia. Royal Prussia, Poland and Liberty, 1569–1772, Cambridge, 2000, ISBN 0-521-58335-7
- Citizenship and Identity in a Multi-national Commonwealth: Poland–Lithuania in Context, 1569–1795 (Leiden: Brill, 2009)
- The Cultivation of Monarchy and the Rise of Berlin. Brandenburg 1700, co-authorship with Sara Smart (Ashgate, 2010)
- Festivals in Germany and Europe: New Approaches to European Festival Culture, ed. by Karin Friedrich (Lewiston, Queenston, Lampeter: Edwin Mellen Press, 2000) 396 pp
- Brandenburg-Prussia, 1466–1806 Palgrave Macmillan 2012, as part of Studies in European History, ISBN 978-0-230-53565-7
- Die Erschließung des Raumes: Konstruktion, Imagination und Darstellung von Räumen und Grenzen im Barockzeitalter, Wolfenbütteler Arbeiten zur Barockforschung Bd. 51, 2 vols, Göttingen: Harrasowitz, 2014, 978-3-447-10055-7.

Articles

- Polish-Lithuanian Political Thought, 1450–1700: in Howell Lloyd, Glenn Burgess, Simon Hodson (eds), History of European Political Thought, 1450–1700 (Yale University Press, 2007), 409–47.
- German History 22:3 (2004), special issue: Polish Views of German History articles: "Pomorze" or "Preussen": Polish Perspectives on early modern Prussian History, pp. 190–217, and Introduction (co-authored with Klaus Zernack), 155–168.
- Zwischen zwei Adlern. Kulturelle und ideologische Einflüsse Polen-Litauens auf das herzogliche Preußen vor 1701 [Between Two Eagles. Cultural and ideological influences of Poland–Lithuania on Ducal Prussia], in: Preußen in Ostmitteleuropa [Prussia in East Central Europe], ed. by Matthias Weber (Oldenburg, 2003), 115–141.
- Nationsbewußtsein im Schlesien der frühen Neuzeit [National identity in early modern Silesia], in: Die Grenzen der Nationen. Nationale Identitätenwandel in Oberschlesien in der Neuzeit, edited by Kai Struve and Philipp Ther (Marburg: Herder-Institut, 2002), 19–44.
- The Development of Prussian Towns, 1720–1815, in P. Dwyer, ed., The Rise of Prussia: Re-thinking Prussian History, 1700–1830, (London: Adison, Wesley, Longman, 2001), 129-150
