= Mikołaj Wejher =

Mikołaj Wejher (died 1647) was a Polish nobleman from the prominent Wejher family. He was the son of Jan Wejher and Anna Szczawińska.

He held various offices in the Polish–Lithuanian Commonwealth. He was Voivode of Malbork since 1641 and Voivode of Chełmno since 1643. Mikołaj was also starost of Radzyń and Kowalewo.
