= Franciszek Jan Bieliński =

Polish statesman and urban reformer (1683–1766)

Franciszek Bieliński
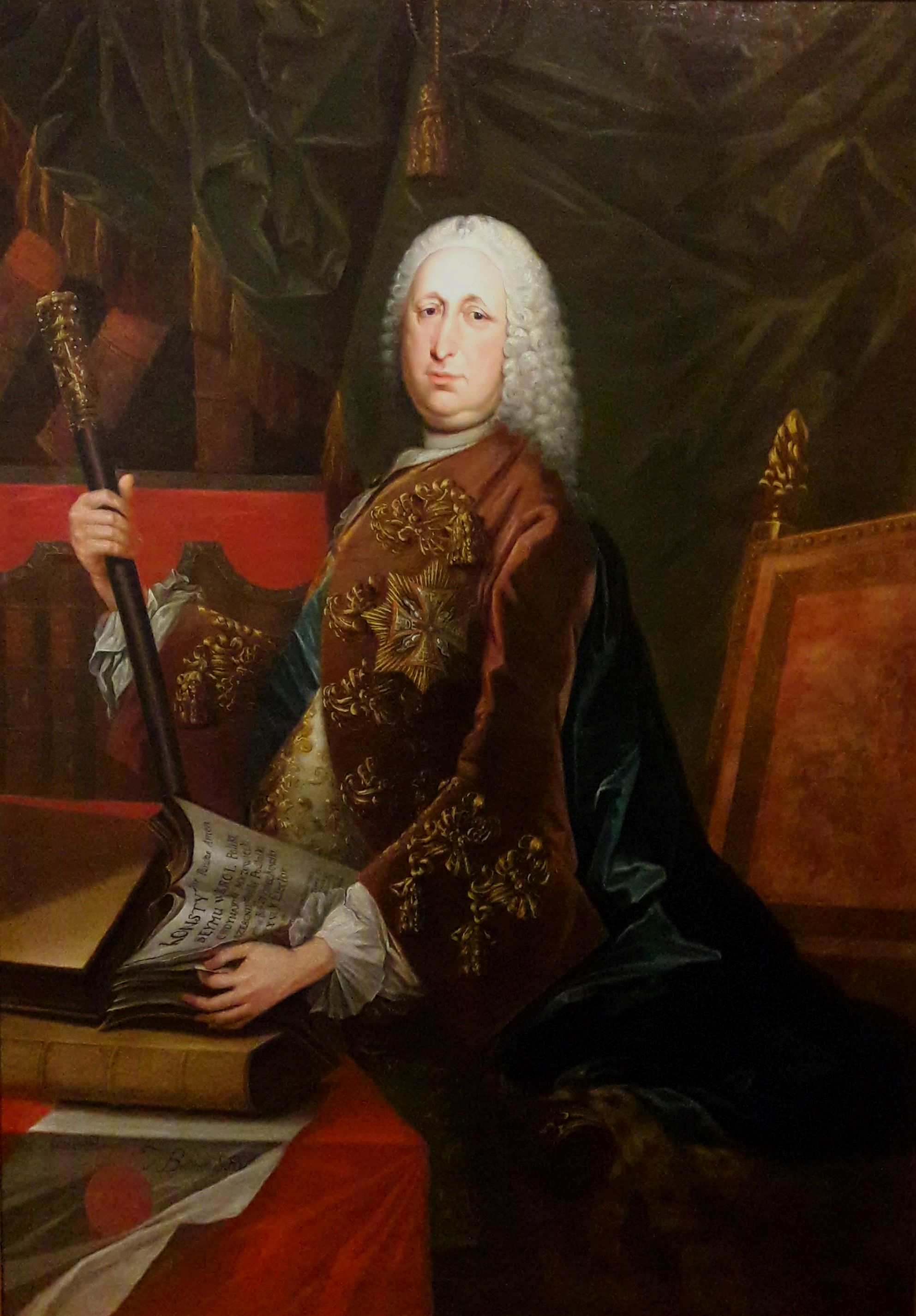
- Portrait of Franciszek Bieliński, Grand Marshal of the Crown
- Born: 1683
- Died: 8 October 1766 (aged 82–83); Warsaw, Polish–Lithuanian Commonwealth
- Occupation: Statesman · Urban reformer
- Known for: Reforms of Warsaw · namesake of Marszałkowska Street

Franciszek Bieliński (1683 – 8 October 1766) was a Polish nobleman and statesman serving as Grand Marshal of the Crown. He is particularly remembered for leading the mid‑18th-century modernization of Warsaw.
