= Elbląg Voivodeship (1454–1466) =

European polity

- Voivodeship of the Crown of the Kingdom of Poland
- 1454–1466
- Capital: Elbląg
- Government
- Voivode
  - 1454 (first): Gabriel of Baysen
  - 1457–1466 (last): Otto Machwicz
- History
  - Established: April 1454
  - Second Peace of Thorn: 19 October 1466
- Contained within
  - Country: Crown of the Kingdom of Poland
| Preceded by | Succeeded by |
| State of the Teutonic Order | Malbork Voivodeship |

The Elbląg Voivodeship, (Note: Polish pronunciation: [ˈɛlblɔŋk]; Polish: Województwo elbląskie; Latin: Palatinatus Elbingensis; German: Woiwodschaft Elbing) also known as the Lower Prussian Voivodeship, (Note: Polish: województwo niderlandzkie, województwo nyderlandzkie; German: Woiwodschaft Niederland) was a voivodeship of the Crown of the Kingdom of Poland, with capital in the city of Elbląg, that existed during the Thirteen Years' War. It was established by king Casimir IV Jagiellon in April 1454, following the incorporation of the city and the surrounding area into Poland, from the territory of the State of the Teutonic Order. Following the signing of the Second Peace of Thorn, on 19 October 1466, the area of the voivodeship was officially ceded to Poland, after which, it was replaced by the Malbork Voivodeship.

== History ==
Prior to 1454, the city of Elbląg, and the surrounding area belonged to the State of the Teutonic Order. In 1454, the state fought in the Thirteen Years' War, against the Crown of the Kingdom of Poland and the Prussian Confederation. On 12 February 1454, the inhabitants of Elbląg revolted against the Teutonic forces, and allied themselves with the Prussian Confederation. As such, the city and the surrounding area pledged its alliance to the king of Poland, Casimir IV Jagiellon. The king established the Elbląg Voivodeship in April 1454, appointing Gabriel of Baysen as its first voivode. The city remained under the control of Poland until the end of war, which ended with the signing of the Second Peace of Thorn, on 19 October 1466. In accordance to the peace treaty, the State of the Teutonic Order ceded the area to Poland, which reformed the province into the Malbork Voivodeship.

== Voivodes ==
The voivodeship was governed by the voivodes. They were:

- April 1454 – December 1454: Gabriel of Baysen
- 1456–1457: Stibor of Baysen
- 6 July 1457 – 1466: Otto Machwicz
