= Wejher coat of arms =

Polish coat of arms

Weiher
- Alternative names: Skarzyna, Skarżyna, Pomerzanin, Weicher, Wejher
- Families: Weiher, Weicher, Weier, Weyher, Weychert, Wejchert, Wejher

Weiher is a Polish coat of arms. It was used by several szlachta families in the times of the Polish–Lithuanian Commonwealth.

== Notable bearers ==
Notable bearers of this coat of arms include:

== See also ==
- Polish heraldry
- Heraldry
- Coat of arms
- List of Polish nobility coats of arms

== Sources ==
- Dynastic Genealogy
- Ornatowski.com
