= Kowalewo Pomorskie =

Town in Golub-Dobrzyń County, Kuyavian-Pomeranian Voivodeship, Poland

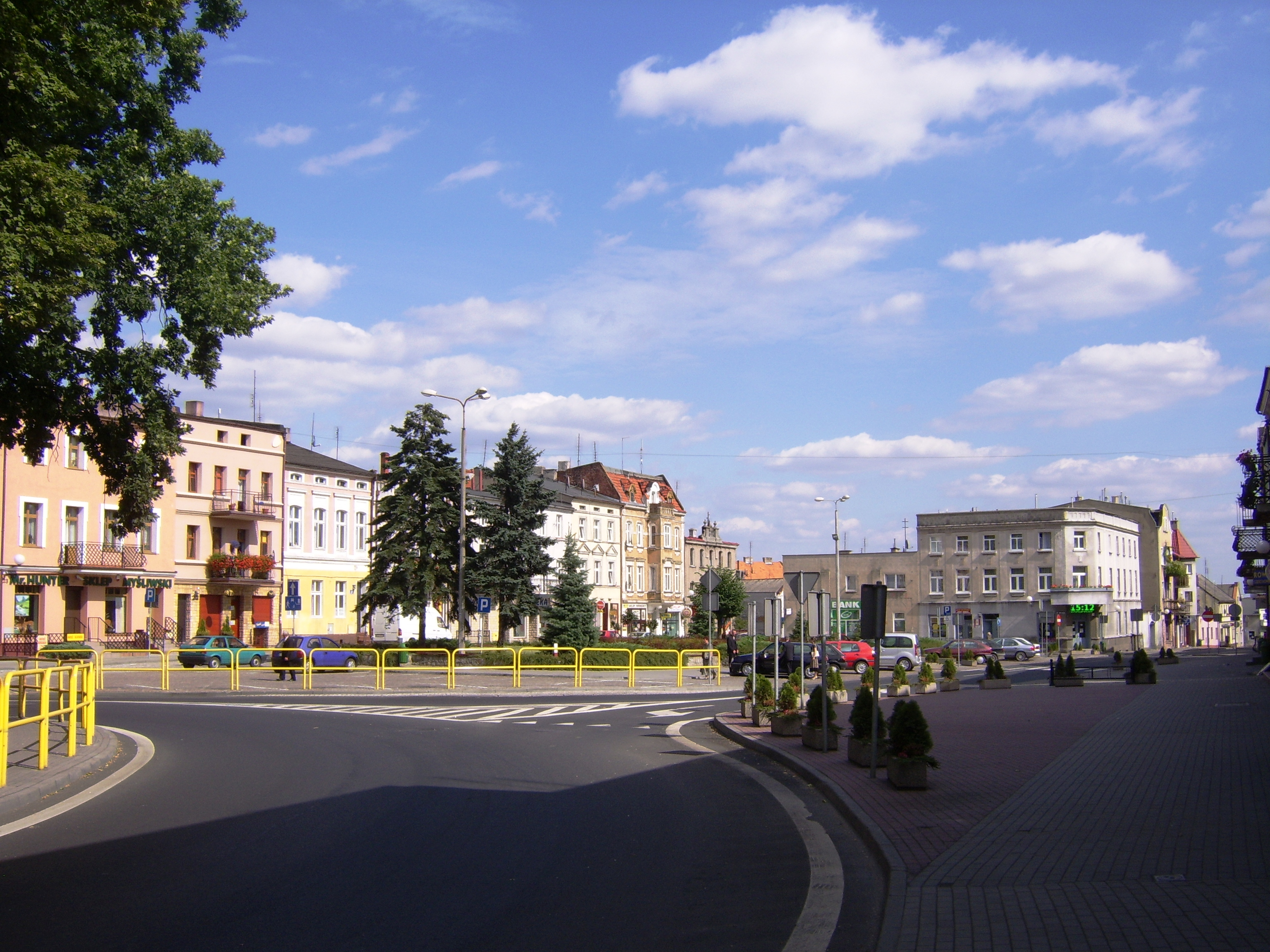
- Rynek (Market square)

- Flag Coat of arms

- Location within Poland
- Coordinates: 53°10′N 18°54′E
- Country: Poland
- Voivodeship: Kuyavian-Pomeranian
- County: Golub-Dobrzyń
- Gmina: Kowalewo Pomorskie
- Established: 13th century
- Town rights: 1275

Government
  - Mayor: Jacek Żurawski

Area
  - Total: 4.45 km^{2} (1.72 sq mi)

Population (2006)
  - Total: 4,055
  - Density: 911/km^{2} (2,360/sq mi)
- Time zone: UTC+1 (CET)
  - Summer (DST): UTC+2 (CEST)
- Postal code: 87-410
- Area code: +48 56
- Car plates: CGD
- Website: http://www.kowalewopomorskie.pl/

Kowalewo Pomorskie [kɔvaˈlɛvɔ pɔˈmɔrskʲɛ] is a town in north-central Poland, in Golub-Dobrzyń County, Kuyavian-Pomeranian Voivodeship. It is the capital of the Gmina Kowalewo Pomorskie.

According to data from December 31, 2004, Kowalewo Pomorskie had 4,130 inhabitants.

== Etymology ==
The name Kowalewo can be roughly translated as the "place of a smith".

== History ==
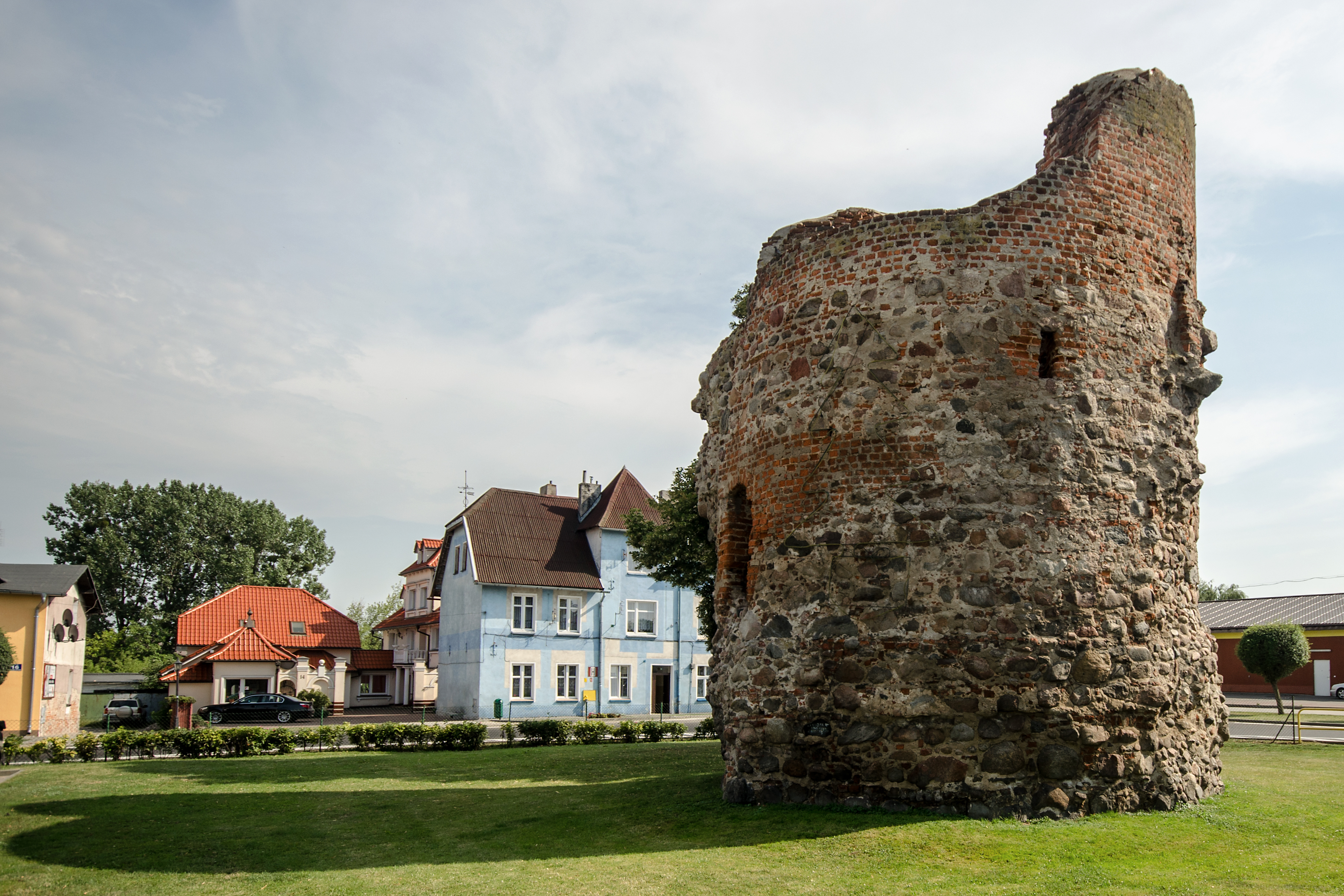
Ruins of a medieval bastion are a local attraction

The area became of the emerging Polish state in the 10th century. The town was arranged into a rectangular shape, with a typical Central European marketplace. During the times of the Teutonic Knights, Kowalewo was privileged to have its own coat of arms, which represented two red fish on a white background. The coat of arms was modified over the centuries, with one red fish being retained. In the beginning, the town's commander was Rudolf Kowalewo, who owned 1,000 serfs.

During the Polish–Lithuanian–Teutonic War, in 1410, it was captured by local Poles and then handed over to the Polish King.

The town joined the Prussian Confederation, which opposed Teutonic rule, and upon the request of which King Casimir IV Jagiellon reincorporated the territory to the Kingdom of Poland in 1454. On 28 May 1454 the town pledged allegiance to the Polish King in Toruń. In 1455 King Casimir IV Jagiellon appointed the city's starost, Gabriel Bażyński. Later, when Bażyński became the voivode, Jan Plemięcki, a courtier of the king, was made the starost. All that remains of this castle today is a ruined defensive tower, a local attraction and current symbol of the town. Kowalewo was a royal town administratively located in the Chełmno Voivodeship in the province of Royal Prussia in the Greater Poland Province of the Kingdom of Poland. Two medieval Gothic churches existed in the town, Saint Nicholas' and Saint Anne's.

During the Polish–Swedish War, on February 11, 1629, Field Marshal Wrangel ordered the Swedes to plunder and sack Kowalewo. From 1655 until 1657, during Swedish Deluge, the Swedes occupied the area once more. The subsequent Prussian and Swedish wars, which continued for eighteen years, turned the region into rubble.

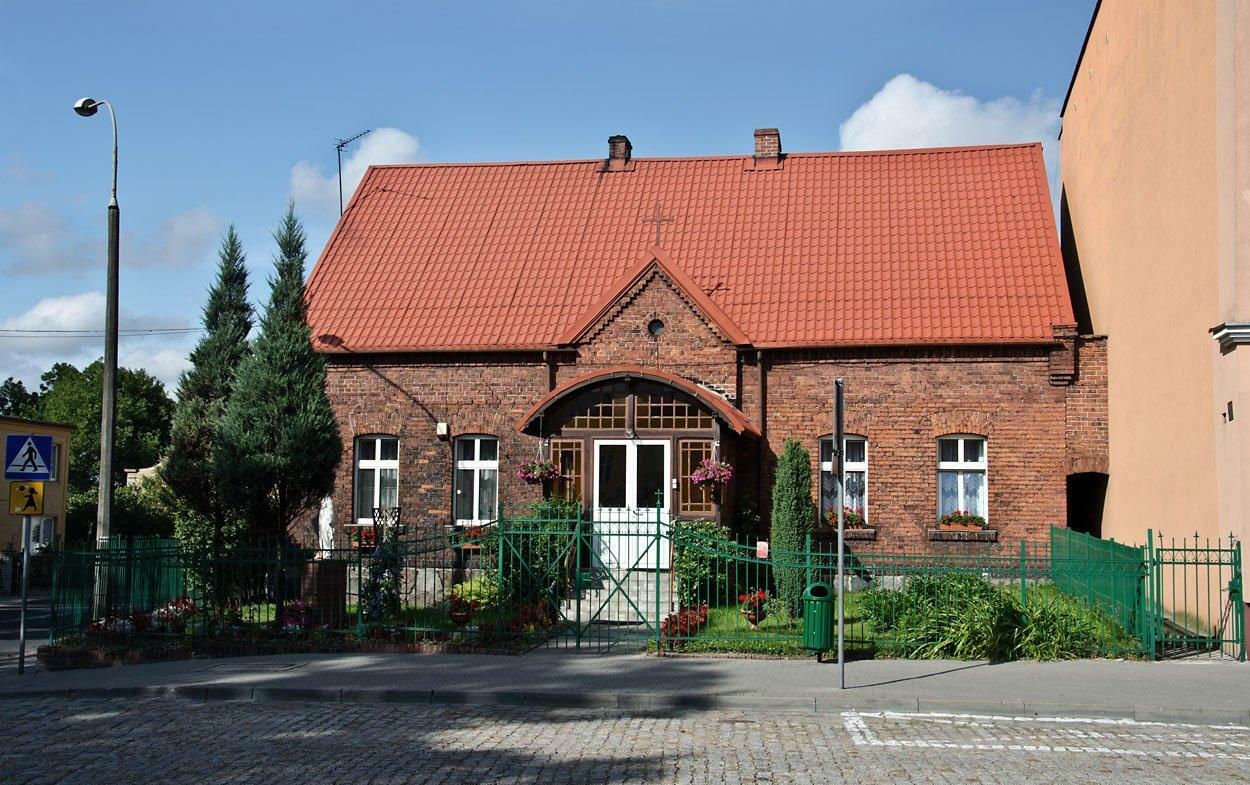
Historical brick architecture is still evident in the area

There were a series of civil wars during the reign of kings Augustus II the Strong and under Stanisław I Leszczyński in the first half of the 18th century. On October 5, 1716, during Augustus' rule, the Russian army took what was left of Kowalewo's supplies. The town had 1,000 citizens and 120 homesteads before these wars, and by 1772 it had only 300 citizens and 34 homesteads.

The town was annexed by Prussia in the First Partition of Poland in 1772, and afterwards, on September 16, 1772, the local starost, Franciszek Stanisław Czapski, pledged allegiance to the Prussian king, Frederick II of Prussia. This resulted in the town becoming Germanized, as German colonists came to build new homesteads and farms. All former governments were replaced and were now part of the newly established Marienwerder Region. The new government permitted Polish shoemakers, blacksmiths, bricklayers, and carpenters to continue operation.

Many Poles were required to join the Prussian military by the order of Frederick II. Many deserted from their compulsory service in the army. The Prussians also sought to increase the taxes. It was also part of the Duchy of Warsaw from 1807 to 1815, before being reannexed by Prussia, and later local peasants also contributed to the Polish January Uprising.

In 1873, there was a voluntary fire brigade in Kowalewo, and by 1883, the town had its first bank.

Kowalewo was restored to Poland, which regained independence in 1918. During the German occupation of Poland (World War II), Poles were subject to mass arrests, expulsions and massacres. Some Polish craftsmen and farmers from Kowalewo were murdered in large massacres in the nearby village of Łopatki (see Intelligenzaktion).

From 1975 to 1998, it was administratively part of the Toruń Voivodeship.

== Sport ==
The local football team is Promień Kowalewo Pomorskie, which competes in the lower leagues.

== Gallery ==
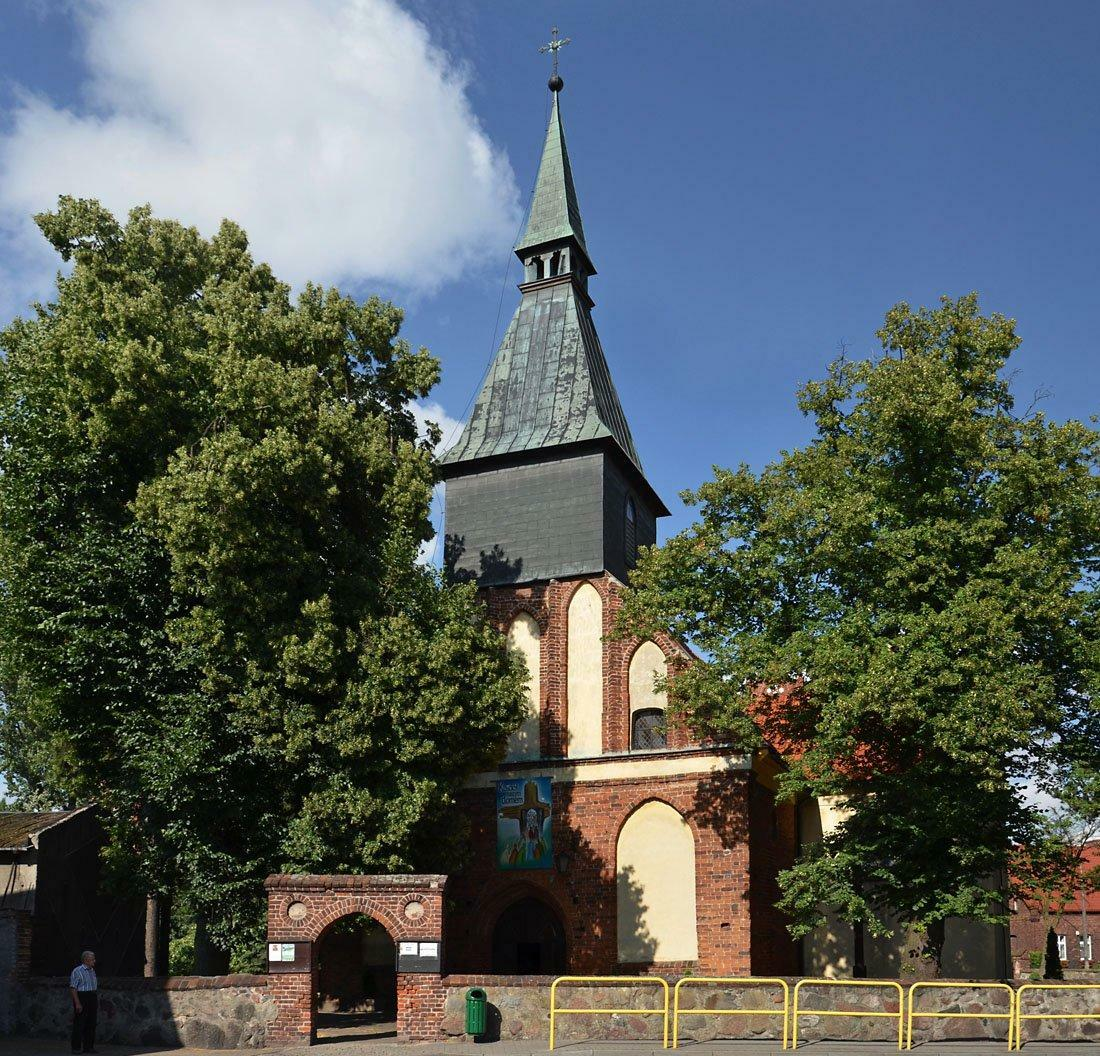
Saint Nicholas church

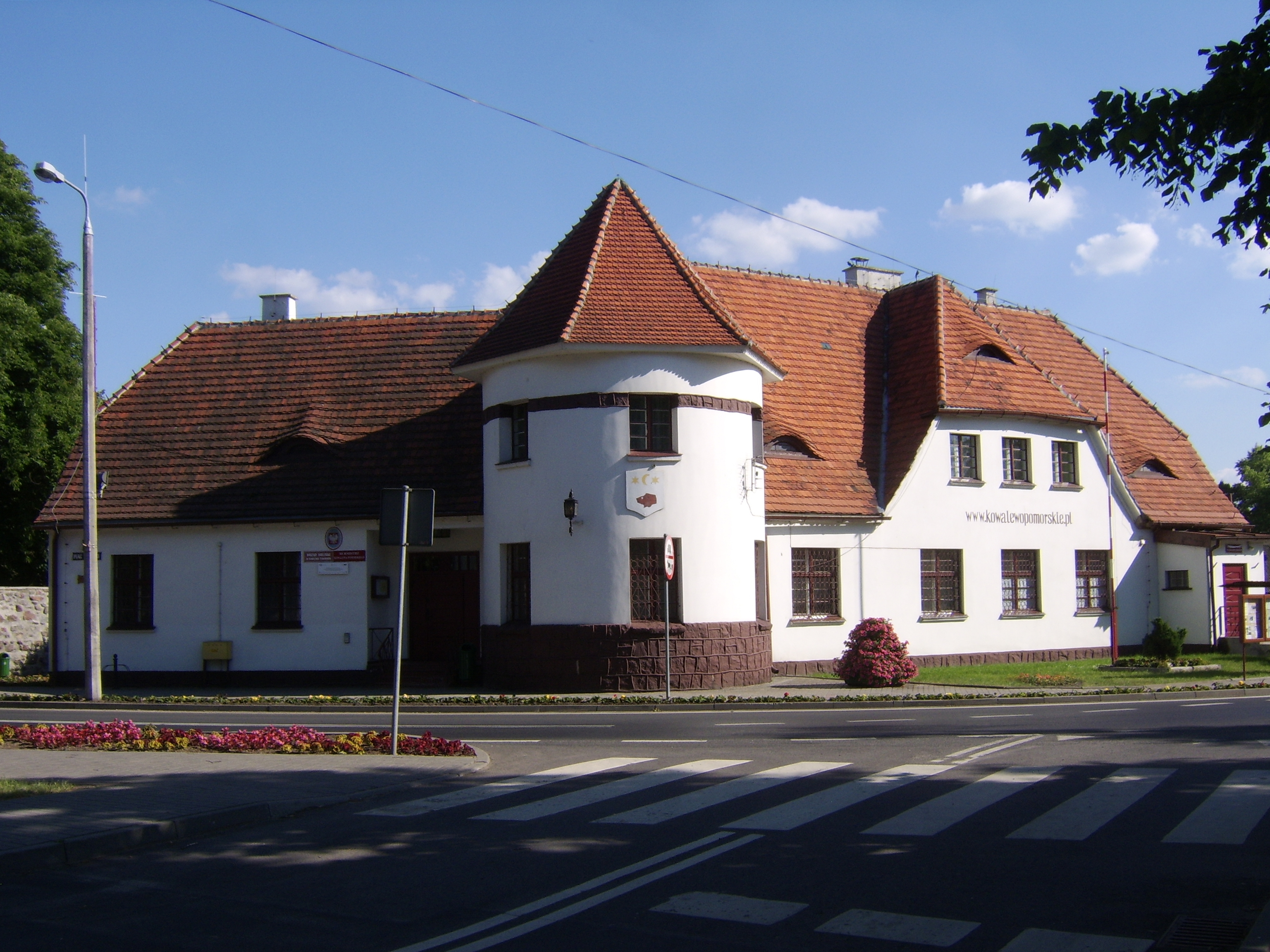
Municipal office

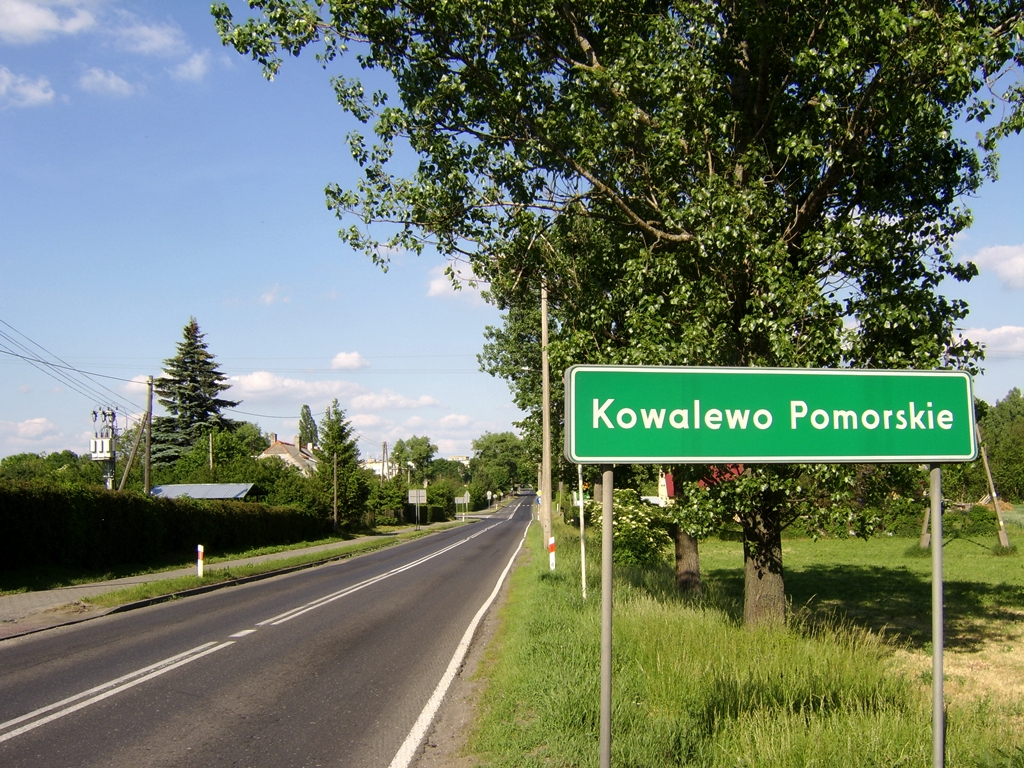
Entry into the town

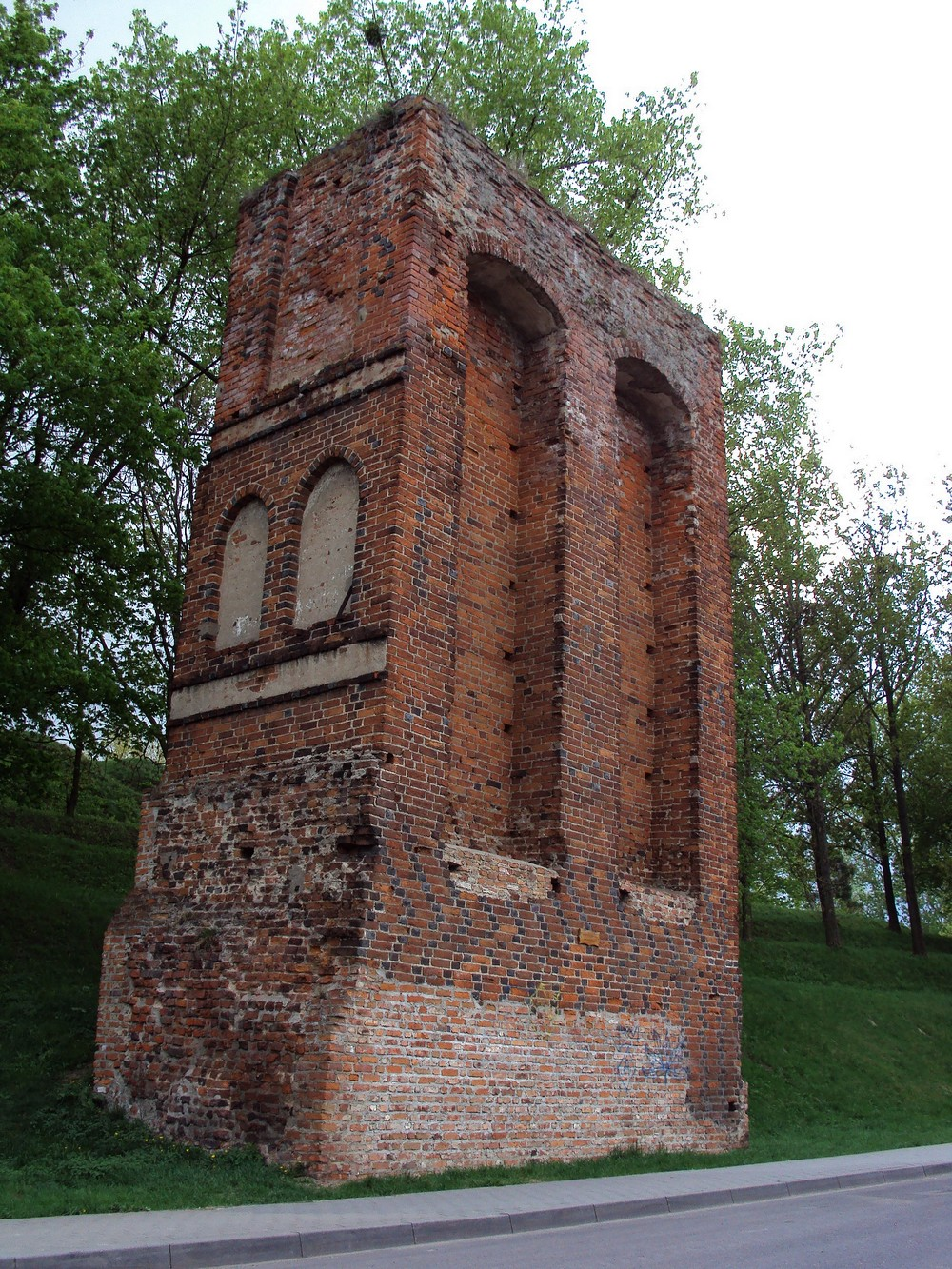
Remains of a medieval castle
