= Chełmno Voivodeship =

Former administrative division in Poland

Coordinates: 53°20′58″N 18°25′27″E

Chełmno Voivodeship Województwo chełmińskie Palatinatus Culmensis
- Voivodeship of Poland¹; Part of Royal Prussia and Greater Poland provinces
- 1454–1793
- Coat of arms

- Chełmno Voivodeship of the Polish–Lithuanian Commonwealth (in 1619)
- Capital: Chełmno
- Area
- 4,654 km^{2} (1,797 sq mi)
- History
  - Established: 1454
  - 2nd Peace of Toruń: 1466
  - 1st Polish partition: 1772
  - 2nd Polish partition: 1793
- Political subdivisions: Two lands divided into 7 counties
Preceded by	Succeeded by
State of the Teutonic Order / State of the Teutonic Order	West Prussia / West Prussia
- Today part of: Poland
- ¹ Voivodeship of the Polish Crown in the Polish–Lithuanian Commonwealth; Voivodeship of the Kingdom of Poland before 1569.

The Chełmno Voivodeship (Polish: Województwo chełmińskie) was a unit of administrative division and local government in the Kingdom of Poland since 1454/1466 until the Partitions of Poland in 1772/1793. Its capital was at Chełmno.

Together with the Pomeranian and Malbork Voivodeships and the Prince-Bishopric of Warmia it formed the province of Royal Prussia, and with several other voivodeships it formed the Greater Poland Province.

== History ==
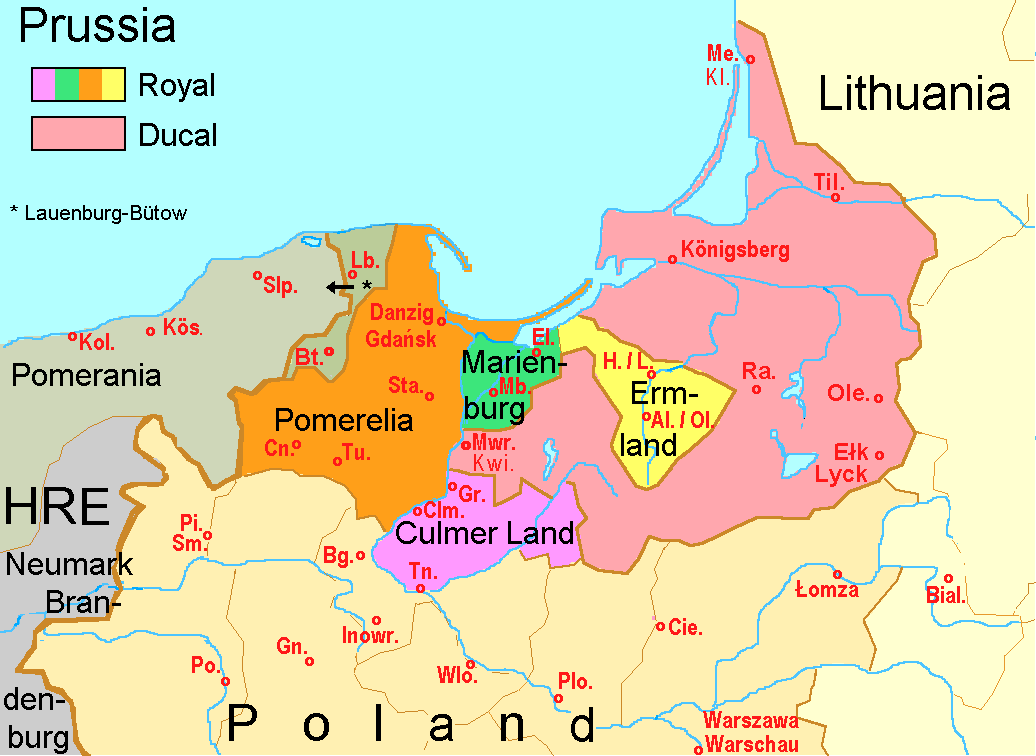
Province of Royal Prussia in 1525 Chełmno Voivodeship (Culmer Land)

The Chełmno Land had been part of the Polish Duchy of Masovia since 1138. It was occupied by pagan Old Prussian tribes in 1216, who struggled against their Christianization instigated by Bishop Christian of Oliva. After several unsuccessful attempts to reconquer Chełmno, Duke Konrad I of Masovia in 1226 called for support by the Teutonic Knights, who indeed approached and started a Prussian campaign, after the duke promised to grant the Chełmno Land as a fief to the Teutonic Order.

In the course of the Order's decline after the 1410 Battle of Grunwald, the citizens of Chełmno, Toruń (Thorn), Lubawa (Löbau), Brodnica, Grudziądz, Nowe Miasto and Radzyń co-formed the anti-Teutonic Prussian Confederation. In 1454, the organisation led an uprising against the rule of the Teutonic Knights, and asked King Casimir IV of Poland to reincorporate the region to the Kingdom of Poland, to which the King agreed and signed the act of reincorporation, which sparked the Thirteen Years' War between the Knights and the Kingdom of Poland. The towns and nobles of the region then took an oath of allegiance to Poland in Toruń on 28 May 1454. The Chełmno Voivodeship was established the same year. After the Order's defeat, the reintegration of Chełmno Land with Poland was confirmed in the Second Peace of Thorn and together with the adjacent Lubawa Land in the east it formed the Chełmno Voivodeship of the Kingdom of Poland, since the 1569 Union of Lublin part of the Polish–Lithuanian Commonwealth.

The voivodeship was annexed by Prussia during the First Partition of Poland in 1772, except for the city of Toruń, which was not incorporated into the province of West Prussia until the 1793 Second Partition.

== Administration ==
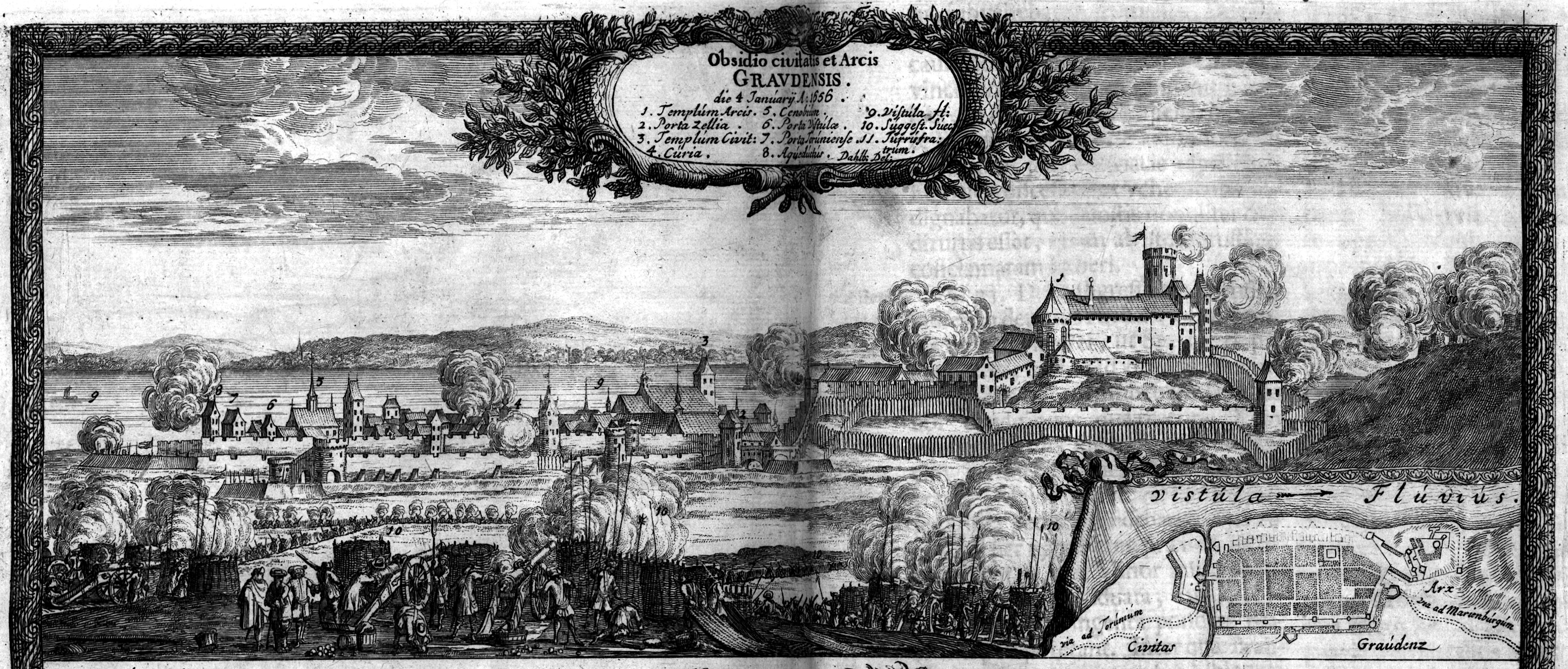
Grudziądz, seat of the General Sejmik, in the 17th century

Voivodeship Governor (Wojewoda) seat:

- Chełmno

Regional council (sejmik generalny)

- Grudziądz

Regional councils (sejmik poselski i deputacki)

- Kowalewo
- Radzyń

Administrative division:

- Chełmno Land (Ziemia Chełmińska), Chełmno
  - Chełmno County (Powiat Chełmiński), Chełmno
  - Toruń County (Powiat Toruński), Toruń
  - Grudziądz County (Powiat Grudziądzki), Grudziądz
  - Radzyń County (Powiat Radzyński), Radzyń
  - Kowalewo County (Powiat Kowalewski), Kowalewo
- Michałowo Land (Ziemia Michałowska), Lubawa
  - Brodnica County (Powiat Brodnicki), Brodnica
  - Nowe Miasto County (Powiat Nowomiejski), Nowe Miasto

== Cities and towns ==
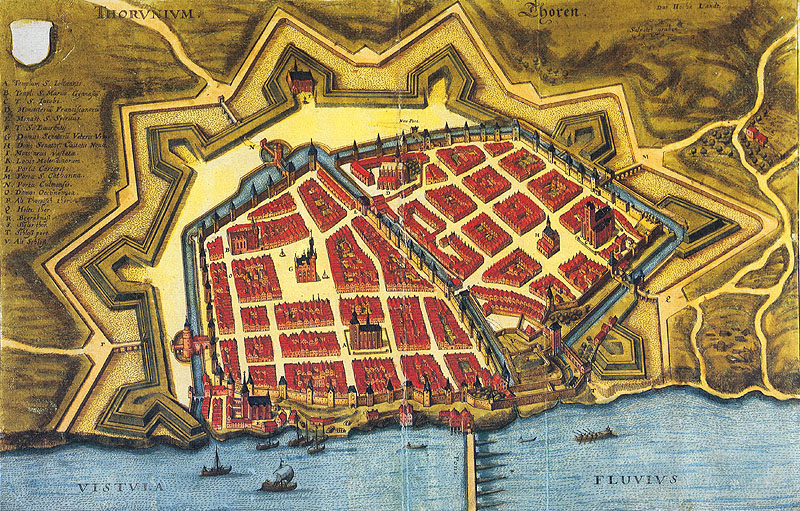
Toruń, the largest city in the voivodeship, in the 17th century

The largest city of the voivodeship was the royal city of Toruń, which as one of the largest and most influential cities of entire Poland enjoyed voting rights during the Royal free elections. It was the birthplace of the renowned astronomer Nicolaus Copernicus in 1473, and place of death of Polish King John I Albert in 1501. It was the location of the Sejm of the Polish–Lithuanian Commonwealth (parliament) in 1576 and 1626, and the Colloquium Charitativum, a three-month congress of European Catholics, Lutherans, and Calvinists, considered an important event in the history of interreligious dialogue, held in 1645 on the initiative of King Władysław IV Vasa at a time when religious conflicts occurred in many other European countries and the disastrous Thirty Years' War was fought west of Poland.

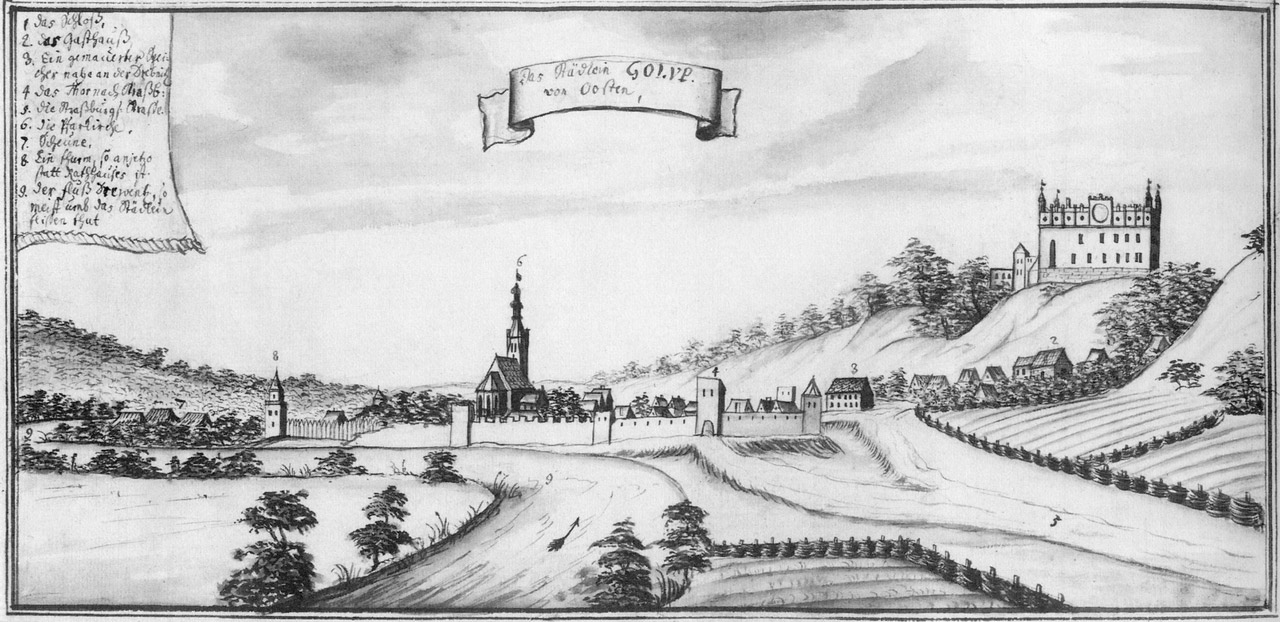
Royal town of Golub in the 18th century

Other royal cities and towns were Brodnica, Golub, Grudziądz, Kowalewo, Lidzbark, Łasin, Nowe Miasto, Radzyń, Rogoźno, whereas private church towns were Chełmno, Chełmża, Kurzętnik, Lubawa and Wąbrzeźno. In 1750, also Ostromecko was granted town rights, which, however, it was deprived of shortly after its annexation by Prussia in the First Partition of Poland.

The most prominent educational institutions of the province were the Academic Gymnasium in Toruń, founded in 1594 from a former municipal school, and the Chełmno Academy in Chełmno, transformed from a local gymnasium in 1692, which in 1756 became a branch of the Jagiellonian University in Kraków, the oldest and leading Polish university. Grzegorz Gerwazy Gorczycki, one of the greatest Polish Baroque composers, was a lecturer at the Chełmno Academy in the 1690s. Lubawa was the place where the decision was made to publish Copernicus' groundbreaking work De revolutionibus orbium coelestium.

== Voivodes ==
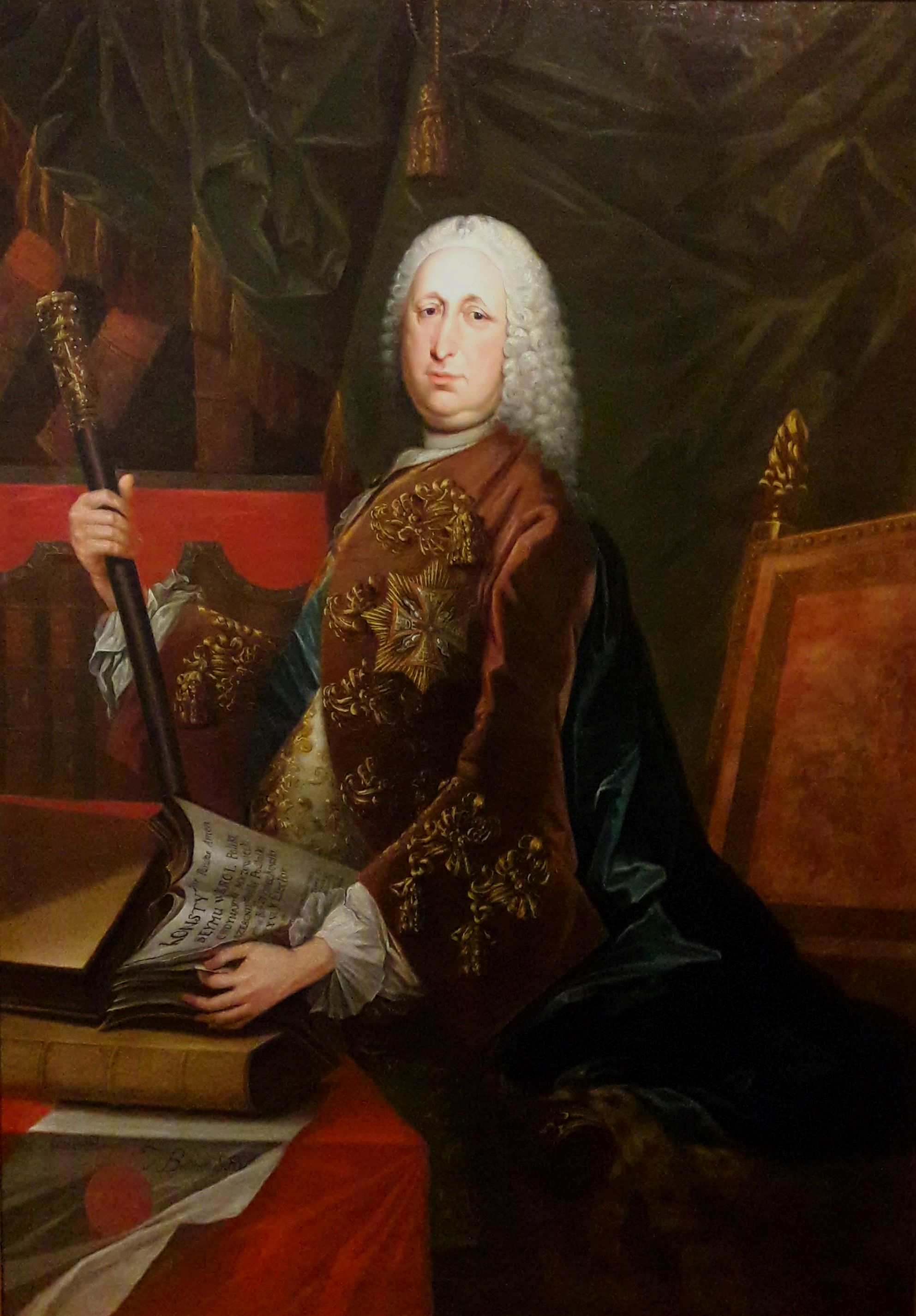
Franciszek Bieliński, voivode in 1725–1732

1. Augustyn z Szewy, 1454–1455
2. Gabriel Bażyński, 1455–1474
3. Ludwik Mortęski, 1475–1480
4. Mikołaj Dąbrowski, 1480–1483
5. Karol z Napola, 1484–1495
6. Jan Dąbrowski, 1498–1513
7. Jan Luzjański, 1514–1551
8. Stanisław Kostka, 1551–1555
9. Jan Działyński, 1556–1583
10. Mikołaj Działyński, 1584–1604
11. Maciej Konopacki, 1605–1611
12. Ludwik Mortęski, 1611–1615
13. Stanisław Działyński, 1615-1615
14. Jan Jakub Wejher, 1618–1626
15. Melchior Wejher, 1626–1643
16. Mikołaj Wejher, 1643–1647
17. Jan Działyński, 1647–1648
18. Jan Kos, 1648–1662
19. Piotr Działyński, 1663–1668
20. Jan Gniński, 1668–1680
21. Michał Działyński, 1681–1687
22. Jan Kos (died 1702),1688–1702
23. Tomasz Działyński, 1702–1714
24. Jakub Zygmunt Rybiński, 1714–1725
25. Franciszek Bieliński, 1725–1732
26. Jan Ansgary Czapski 1732–1738
27. Michał Wiktor Bieliński, 1738–1746
28. Zygmunt Kretkowski, 1746–1766
29. Franciszek Stanisław Hutten-Czapski, 1766–1802

== Bibliography ==
- Gloger, Zygmunt (1900). Geografia historyczna ziem dawnej Polski (in Polish). Kraków.
