= Ludwik Wejher =

Ludwik Wejher (died 1656) was a Polish nobleman, son of Jan Wejher and Anna Szczawińska. He was a colonel of the Polish army and held other offices in the Polish–Lithuanian Commonwealth.

He served in the Polish army during the wars of the 17th century. He defended Zamość from the Cossacks and Tatars in 1648. In 1656 he defended Malbork from the Swedish army under the king Charles X Gustav.

He was castellan of Elbląg since 1648 and since 1649 Voivode of Pomerania. Ludwik was also starost of Wałcz and Swarzewo.
