= Royal Prussia =

Autonomous province of the Kingdom of Poland (1466–1772)

Royal Prussia Prusy Królewskie (Polish) Königlich-Preußen (German) Prussia Regalis (Latin)
- Autonomous province of Poland
- 1466–1772
- Flag Coat of arms

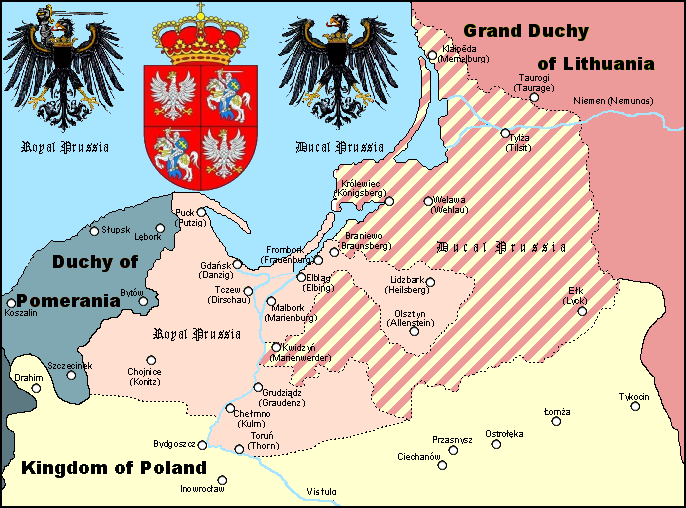
- Map of Royal Prussia (light pink)
- Area
  - Coordinates: 54°N 19°E
- History
  - Established: 19 October 1466
  - Dissolved: 1 July 1772
Preceded by	Succeeded by
State of the Teutonic Order	West Prussia
- Today part of: Poland; Russia¹
- ¹ Small portion of the Vistula Spit around Narmeln (Polski)

Royal Prussia (Polish: Prusy Królewskie; German: Königlich-Preußen or Preußen Königlichen Anteils, Kashubian: Królewsczé Prësë) or Polish Prussia (Polish: Prusy Polskie; German: Polnisch-Preußen) was a province of the Crown of the Kingdom of Poland established as a result of the Partition of Prussia under the Second Peace of Thorn (1466) from territories that had previously formed part of the State of the Teutonic Order. Royal Prussia retained its autonomy, governing itself and maintaining its own laws, customs, and rights.

In 1569, Royal Prussia was fully integrated into the Crown of the Kingdom of Poland and its autonomy was largely abolished. As a result, the Royal Prussian parliament was incorporated into the Sejm of the Polish–Lithuanian Commonwealth. In 1772 and 1793, after the first and second partition of Poland, the former territory of Royal Prussia was annexed by the Kingdom of Prussia and subsequently re-organized into the province of West Prussia.

== Geography ==
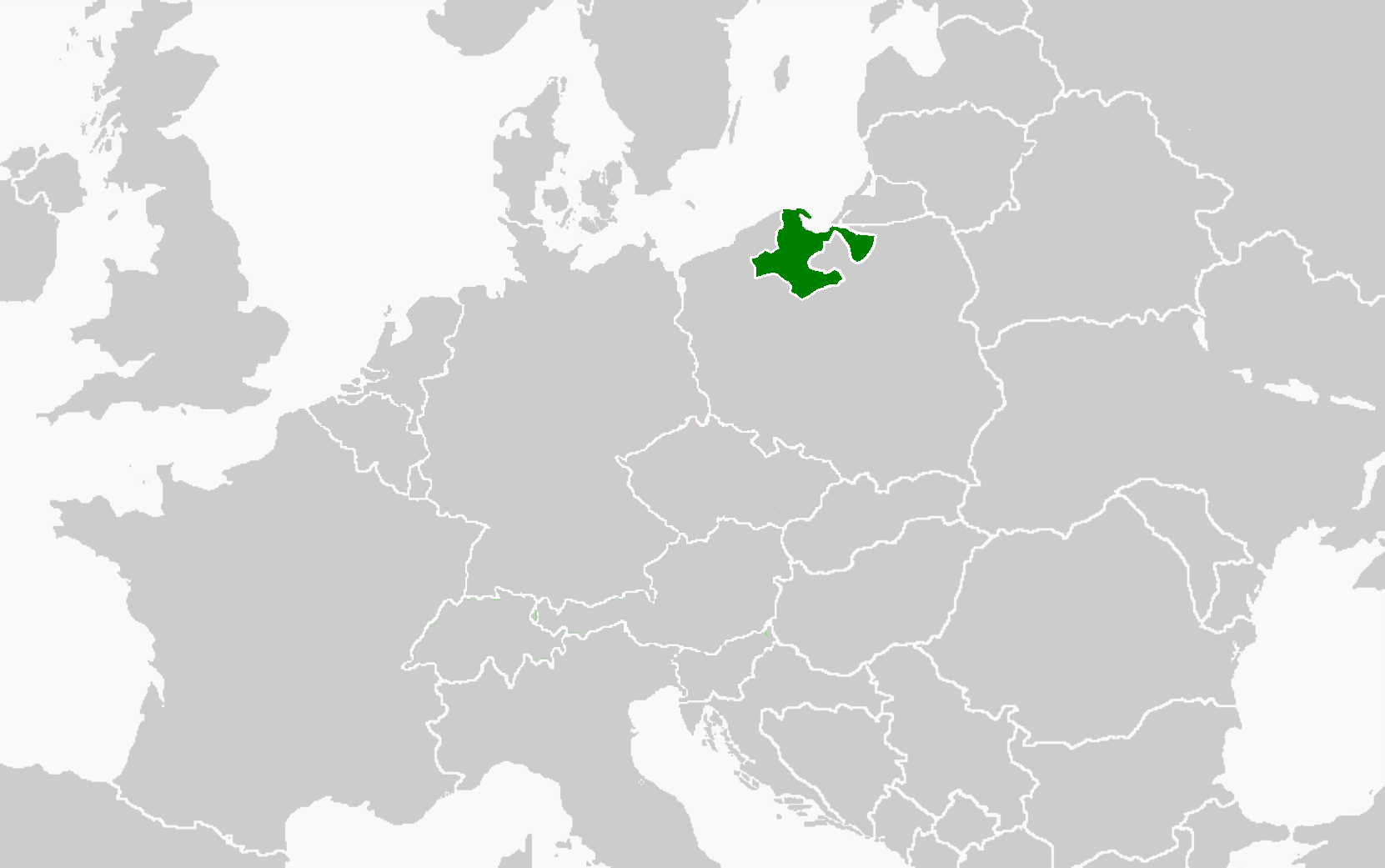
Locator map of Royal Prussia (background current European state borders, not contemporary)

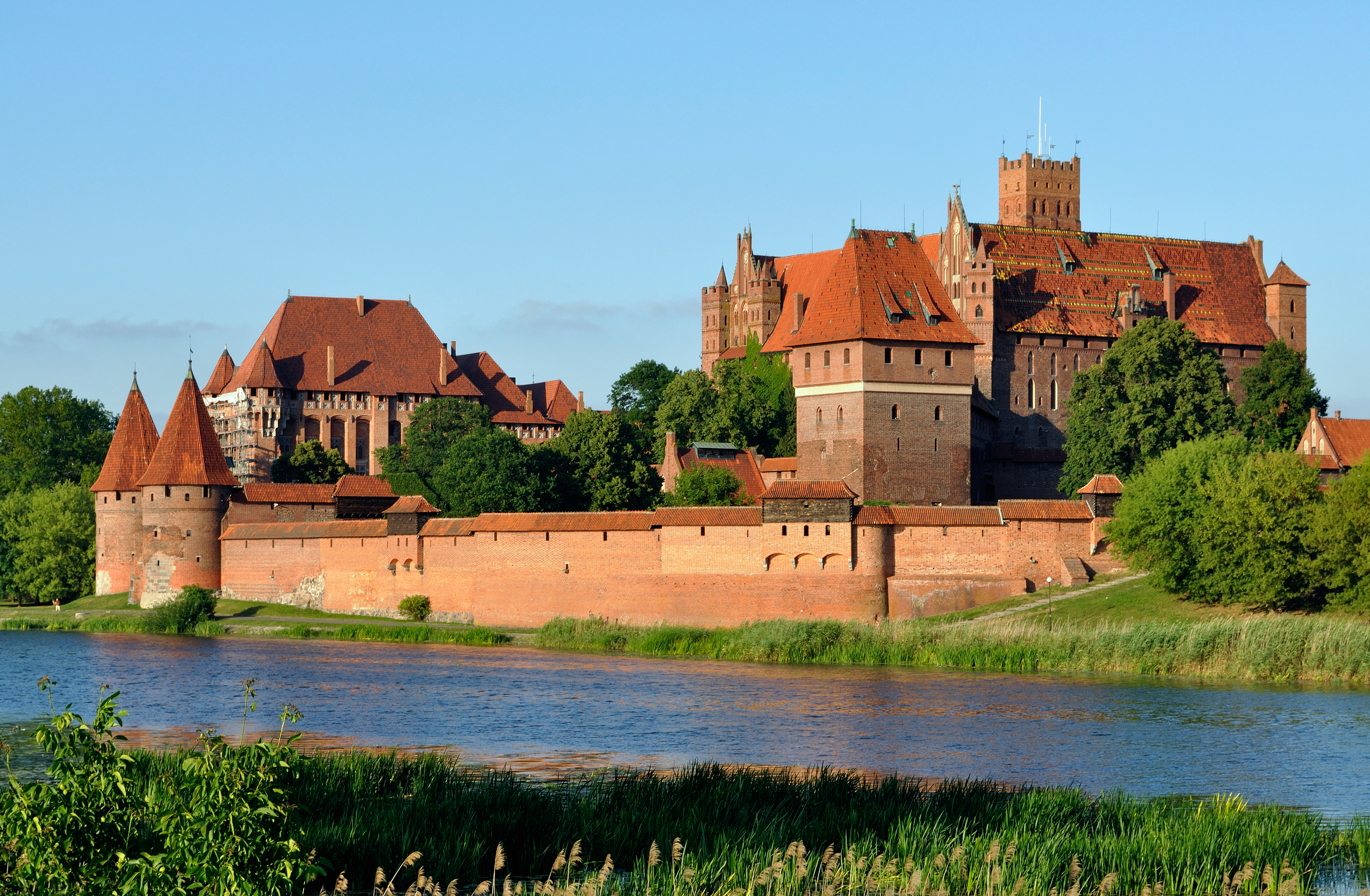
The Malbork Castle in Malbork, Poland. Founded in 1274 by the Teutonic Order on the river Nogat, it served as a Polish Royal castle within the province. It is the world's largest brick castle.

The area consisted of the following territories:

- Pomerelia
  - Pomeranian Voivodeship with the mouth of the Vistula, including the city of Danzig (Gdańsk)
    - the Lauenburg and Bütow Land (Ziemia lęborsko-bytowska), at times ruled as enfeoffed to Poland by the Duchy of Pomerania (Farther), later succeeded by Brandenburg-Prussia
  - Chełmno Land and Michałów Land (Chełmno Voivodeship), including the city of Thorn (Toruń)
- Western part of the original Prussia, renounced and recognized as part of the Kingdom of Poland by the Teutonic Order in the Second Peace of Thorn (1466)
  - the Prince-Bishopric of Warmia (Ermland) with Frauenburg (Frombork), Heilsberg (Lidzbark Warmiński, then Lidzbark) and Allenstein (Olsztyn)
  - the Marienburger Land (Malbork Land), territory covering northern parts of Pomesania and Pogesania with Marienburg (Malbork), Stuhm (Sztum), Christburg (Kiszpork, later Dzierzgoń) and Tolkemit (Tolkmicko), including the City of Elbing (Elbląg)

In contrast, southern remainder of Pomesania and Pogesania, including Marienwerder (Kwidzyn), Deutsch Eylau (Iława), Riesenburg (Prabuty), Rosenberg (Susz), Bischofswerder (Biskupiec), Saalfeld (Zełwałd, later Zalewo), Freystadt (Kisielice), Mohrungen (Morąg), Preußisch Holland (Pasłęk) and Liebstadt (Libsztat, later Miłakowo), formed Upper Prussia (German: Oberland, Polish: Prusy Górne) constituting the westernmost part of the Prussian territory left to the Teutonic Knights, known as Teutonic or Monastic Prussia with Königsberg as its capital, later secularized in 1525 to become Ducal Prussia ruled by the Protestant dukes of the Hohenzollern dynasty. From 1618, this area was ruled in personal union with the Electorate of Brandenburg as Brandenburg-Prussia. In 1657, the Treaty of Wehlau granted full independence to the Duchy of Prussia, allowing its later elevation to Kingdom in Prussia.

== History ==
=== Prussian Confederation ===
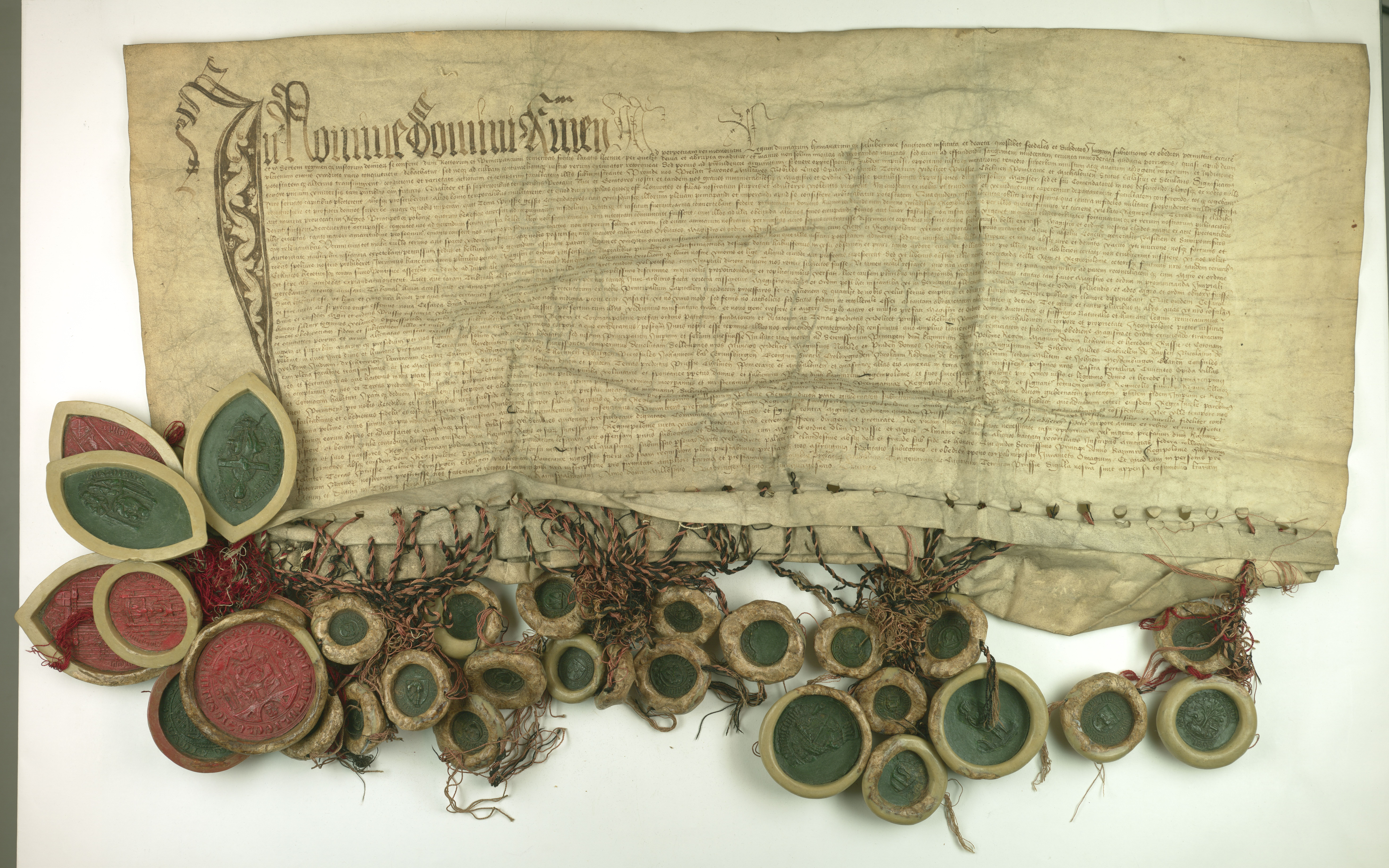
Representatives of the Prussian Confederation take on oath of allegiance to Poland during the act of incorporation of Prussia in Kraków, 1454, Polish Central Archives of Historical Records.

Originally Polish, the Pomerelian part of the region was gradually emancipating during the fragmentation of Poland upon the death of Bolesław III Wrymouth in 1138. Duchy of Pomerelia became fully independent in 1227, when a troop of Duke Świętopełk I of Pomerania attacked the assembly of the Polish princes and murdered the High Duke Leszek the White. The duchy did not maintain its unity and was divided among the male members of the ducal family. All of Pomerelia came under the rule of Mściwój II in 1273. In 1282, he paid homage to Przemysł II, Duke of Greater Poland, soon to be King of Poland.

During the rule of Władysław I the Elbow-high, the Margraviate of Brandenburg challenged his rule over the territory in 1308, leading Władysław to request assistance from the Teutonic Knights, who ousted the Brandenburgers, but then seized Pomerelia for themselves and incorporated it into the Teutonic Order state in 1309. The papal court of 1320 ordered that Pomerelia be returned to Poland. The arbitration of the kings of Bohemia and Hungary in 1335 recognized the province as a perpetual alms granted by the King of Poland to the Teutonic Order. Another papal court in 1339 awarded Poland the right to all the lands seized by the Teutonic Order and ordered their restitution.

At the beginning of the 15th century, the lands held by the Teutonic Knights were inhabited as a whole by a mixed population; it is estimated that there were about 200 000 Germans in the state altogether, followed by 140 000 native Prussians located in the Prussia proper (east of Vistula), as well about 140 000 Poles in Pomerelia and Masuria. About 110,000 people lived in the 93 towns of the monastic state, that is, nearly one quarter of the population. Proper Prussia was inhabited by 270,000 people, Pomerelia by 130,000, and the Chełmno Land by 80,000. In Pomerelia, Poles constituted two-thirds of the population, and in the Chełmno Land one-half. In the 15th century, a process began of migration from Poland and Lithuania, as well as the gradual assimilation of the local ethnic Prussian population with other groups.

The burden of taxation and the arbitrary way of governing caused resistance among the people of Prussia. The burghers of the great Prussian cities began to organize themselves. The first organized body was the Lizard League, founded by the Chelmno Land nobility in 1397. After being defeated at the Battle of Grunwald in 1410, the Teutonic Knights' prestige declined; most towns and castles, as well as three Prussian bishops, swore loyalty to the Polish king. Although the Order soon regained control over most of its territory, by the 1411 Peace of Thorn it was forced to pay large compensation of 100,000 kop groszy for the return of prisoners, which became a financial burden on the citizenry. Facing the opposition, the Komtur of Danzig ordered the execution without a trial of the city's mayor, Konrad Letzkau, along with two councillors and five Chełmno nobles.

In order to protect their rights, nobles and burghers created for the first time a joint assembly in 1412. Subsequent peace treaties (1422 and 1435) with Poland gave the Order's subjects the right to throw off its sovereignty if it violated them. In 1440, as the tax burden rose, the nobles and various cities established the Prussian Confederation at Marienwerder (Kwidzyn) in resistance to the Order's domestic and financial policies. This confederation formed a self-governing bicameral institution, representing nobles and burghers of the province, which made decisions unanimously. Many additional nobles, cities, and towns soon joined the organization.

The Confederation was led by the citizens of Danzig, Elbing, and Thorn. The gentry from Chełmno Land and Pomerelia participated as well. After the monastic knights complained to the Emperor and Council of Basel, the Prussian parliament had to dissolve itself in 1449, but immediately resumed its clandestine activities. In turn, in February 1454, the Confederation sent a delegation, under Jan Bażyński, to King Casimir IV Jagiellon of Poland, to ask him for support against the Teutonic Order's rule and for incorporation of their homeland into the Kingdom of Poland. In this treaty, Prussian delegates declared the Polish king the only true sovereign of their lands, justified by the historical precedent that the king of Poland had previously ruled them. After lengthy negotiation, on 6 March 1454, the Royal Chancellery issued the Incorporation Act by which King Kazimierz Jagiellończyk accepted inhabitants of the Prussian lands as subjects, incorporated Prussia into the Polish kingdom, and granted them considerable autonomy.

The Prussian estates received confirmation of their rights and privileges, were exempted from paying the Pfundzoll, received the ius indigenatus, the right to decide on Prussian affairs at their own estate assemblies, and a guarantee of the freedom of trade. Thorn, Elbing, Königsberg and Danzig (Danzig law) were to retain the right to mint coins during the war, bearing the image of the Polish king.

=== Thirteen Years' War ===
After the Prussian Confederation pledged allegiance to Casimir on 6 March 1454, the Thirteen Years' War ("War of the Cities") began. King Casimir IV Jagiellon appointed Hans von Baysen (Jan Bażyński) as the first war-time governor of Royal Prussia. On 28 May 1454, the king took an oath of allegiance from the citizens of Chełmno Land, including Toruń (Thorn) in Toruń, and in June a similar oath from the citizens of Elbląg (Elbing) and Królewiec (Königsberg) was taken.

The war also included major cities from the eastern part of the Order's lands, such as Kneiphof, later a part of Königsberg. Though the Knights were victorious at the Battle of Chojnice in 1454, they were not able to finance more knights in order to reconquer the castles occupied by the insurgents. Thirteen years of attrition warfare ended in October 1466 with the Second Peace of Thorn (1466), which provided for the Order's cession to the Polish Crown of its rights over Pomerelia, and the western half of Prussia, including the districts of Elbląg and Malbork (Marienburg).

=== Incorporation into the Polish Crown ===
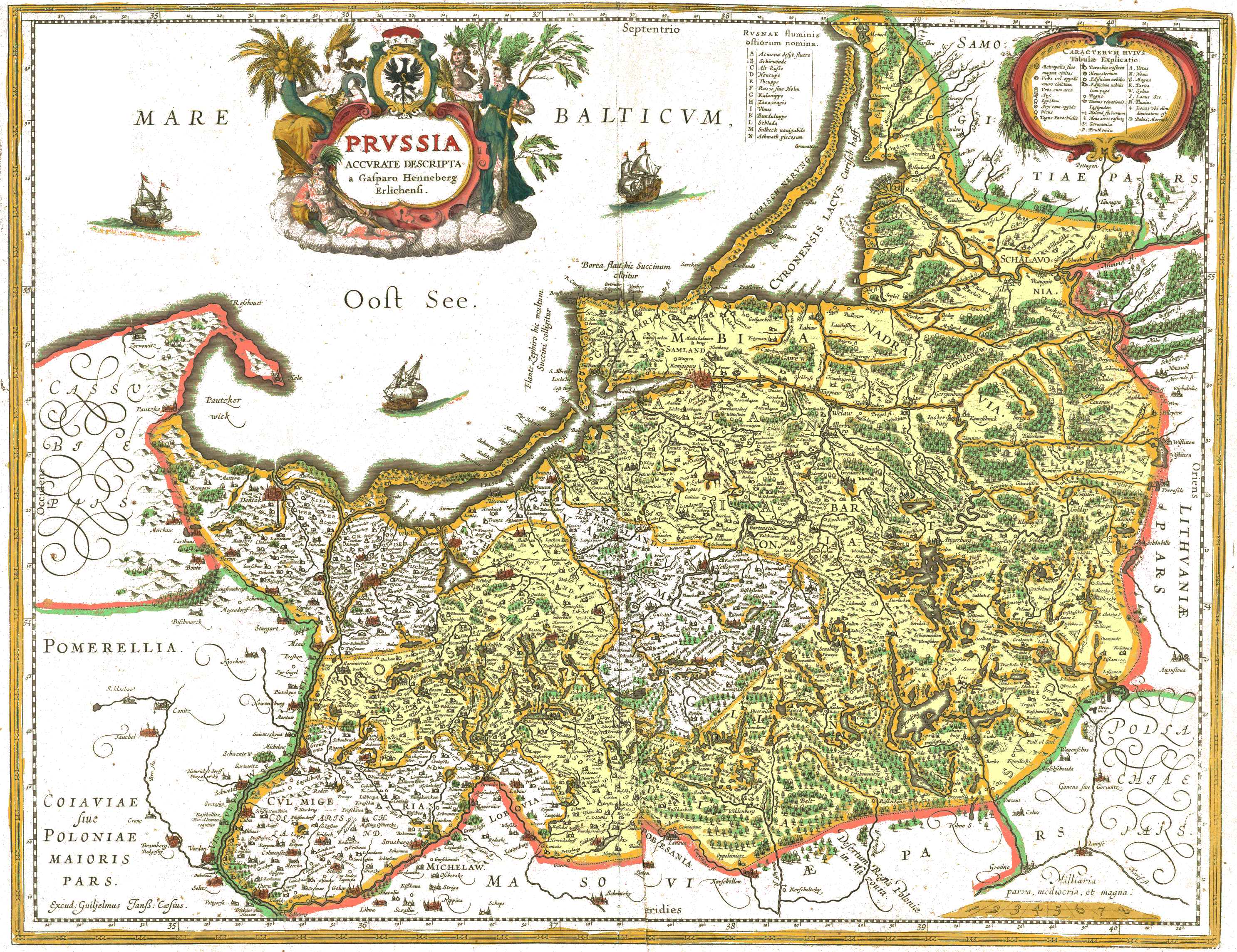
1576 map of Prussia by Caspar Henneberg, Royal Prussia (without southern Pomerelia) appears in white

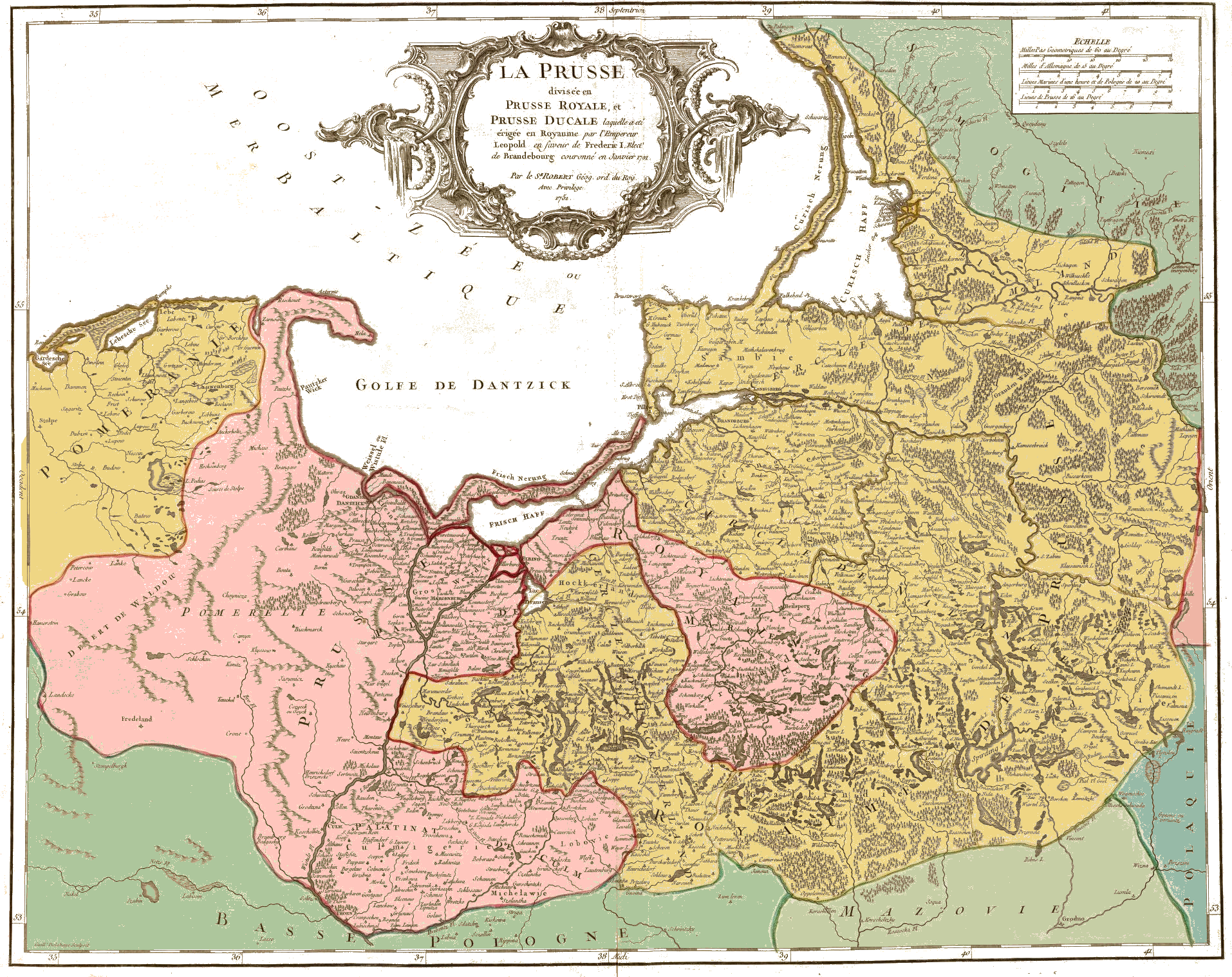
1751 map showing Royal Prussia, province of the Kingdom of Poland, and Ducal Prussia, a vassal duchy of Poland.

According to the 1454 treaty signed by King Casimir IV, Royal Prussia was incorporated into the Kingdom of Poland and their elites enjoyed the same rights and privileges as the elites of the Polish kingdom. At the same time, Royal Prussia was granted a considerable degree of autonomy. Already instituted law codes were retained, only Prussians could be appointed to public offices (ius indigenatus), borders of the province had to remain intact and all decisions regarding Prussia had to be consulted with the Prussian council. Thorn and Danzig retained the right to mint coins.

The Polish model of political and administrative organisation was introduced into the province. Royal Prussia was divided in 1454 into four voivodeships: Pomeranian, Chełmno (Kulm or Culm), Elbing (Elbląg) and Königsberg (Królewiec), which ceased to exist after the Second Peace of Thorn. After the Thirteen Years' War, the voivodeship of Elbing was replaced by the voivodeship of Marienburg (Malbork). Voivodeships were divided subsequently into powiats.

By the decision of the Polish Sejm in 1467, the main governing body of Royal Prussia was the Prussian council (German: Landesrat), which emerged from the secret council of the Prussian Confederation. Three voivodes, three castellans (of Chełmno, Elbing and Danzig), three chamberlains (Polish: podkomorzy) and two delegates from each of the main cities: Thorn, Danzig and Elbing were part of the council. Later bishops of Warmia (1479) and Chełmno (1482) were admitted into a council, which ultimately consisted of 17 members. Since the council wasn't able to impose taxes without the consent of the commons, the gathering of all estates shortly emerged, at first known as Ständetage and later as Landtag. In years 1512–1526 it developed into a bicameral Prussian parliament.

At first, the bishop of Warmia claimed that his principality was independent and subordinate only to the Pope. After a short war — the so-called "priests' war" — the matter was settled in the king's favour; in 1479, Warmia was formally incorporated into Poland. The bishop's subjects were given the right to appeal to the king, to whom they swore allegiance. The Bishop of Warmia became, ex officio, a member of the Prussian council. From 1508, the bishop headed the council. The bishopric of Warmia was a suffragan of the archbishopric of Riga until 1566; after that date it was subordinated directly to the Pope. It was not part of archdiocese of Gniezno.

The Prussian states stood for deep particularism. They were reluctant to participate in the institutions of the kingdom. The members of the council refused to participate in the meetings of the royal council and sent only token delegations to the royal elections in 1492, 1501 and 1506. During the Thirteen Years War, King Casimir IV exercised his authority over the province through the position of governor, which was first held by Hans von Baysen. After his death in 1459, his brother Stibor von Baysen was appointed to the office. Casimir abolished this office in 1467. In 1472, the king introduced the office of starosta general (German: Oberhauptman) in Royal Prussia and appointed Stibor von Baysen to it, which Stibor (unsuccessfully) refused in protest against the violation of Prussian privileges. The son of Stibor, Nicolaus von Baysen, was appointed "royal administrator" (German: Anwalde) in 1480. In 1485, Nicolaus resigned his office and led the Prussian opposition against the violation of Prussian privileges, above all the ius indigenatus. In response, King Casimir strengthened the position of the Malbork starosta, to whom he always appointed a non-Prussian. In 1485, it was a magnate from Lesser Poland, Zbigniew Tęczyński.

The situation changed in 1498 when Frederick of Saxony was elected Grand Master of the Teutonic Order and started a hostile policy against Poland in an attempt to reclaim lost territories in Royal Prussia. As a result, the newly elected bishop of Warmia, Lucas Watzenrode, and Nicholaus von Baysen began to take part in meetings of the royal council. In 1509, Watzenrode took part in a Senate meeting as the first representative of the Prussian council. Ambroży Pampowski, starosta of Malbork between 1504 and 1510, also bore the title Haupt des Landes, and although he was non-Prussian, he was accepted as such by the Prussian council. A monument of the reapprochement between Prussia and the rest of the kingdom was the Statute of Prussia, promulgated in 1506, in which many Polish legal solutions were introduced into the Prussian legal system. An important achievement was the establishment of a central Prussian treasury. In 1511, a supreme tribunal was established for the Prussian courts, excluding the courts of Danzig, which denied the right of appeal to the Prussian court and decided cases internally. It sometimes resorted to royal and parliamentary courts. Closer ties with the rest of the kingdom found support primarily among the ordinary nobility, for whom the Polish political and legal solutions were more favourable. In particular, the inheritance rules applied under Kulm law, which guaranteed inheritance also in the female line, resulted in the fragmentation of estates.

In the years 1519–1521, Albrecht von Hohenzollern lost the Order's last war against Poland. As a result, the Order's state was secularised and became a fief of the Polish crown, held by Albrecht and his direct heirs as "dukes in Prussia". Albrecht ruled as a Lutheran ruler. Lutheranism also spread in Royal Prussia, especially in the big cities. Albrecht decreed that Luther's Catechism was to be translated into the Old Prussian language, Polish, and Lithuanian, so that the creed could unite the people of both the Duchy of Prussia and Royal Prussia. Cultural unity between the two parts of Prussian was threatened by the Polish strive to unite Royal Prussia with Poland proper. The Polish king attempted to stop spread of Protestantism, but it was declared the ruling religion in Danzig, Elbing and Thorn (Gdańsk, Elbląg, Toruń) after 1526 (of course, part of the population remained Catholic in these cities).

During the war, the Polish General Assembly descended to Toruń in 1519 and to Bydgoszcz in 1520. Some Prussian nobles attended it. In 1522, the Prussian nobility gathered in the Landtag demanded the introduction of the Polish model of inheritance and land ownership, excluding the burghers. They also demanded the right to send one deputy from each province to the Polish Sejm. In 1526, the Prussian Landtag, headed by the king, established sejmiks, local assemblies of noblemen, who elected deputies to the Prussian parliament, where they sat together with representatives of 27 smaller towns. The Prussian council formed the upper house – the senate – of this assembly. In 1529, a monetary union was established between Royal Prussia and Ducal Prussia and the rest of the kingdom. From 1537, summons to the Sejm were continuously sent to the Prussian sejmiks. The Prussian nobility appeared permanently at the Sejm as observers. In 1548, after the death of King Sigismund the Old, for the first time, a delegation of both Prussian chambers went to the Sejm as deputies and senators.

=== Integration into the Kingdom of Poland ===
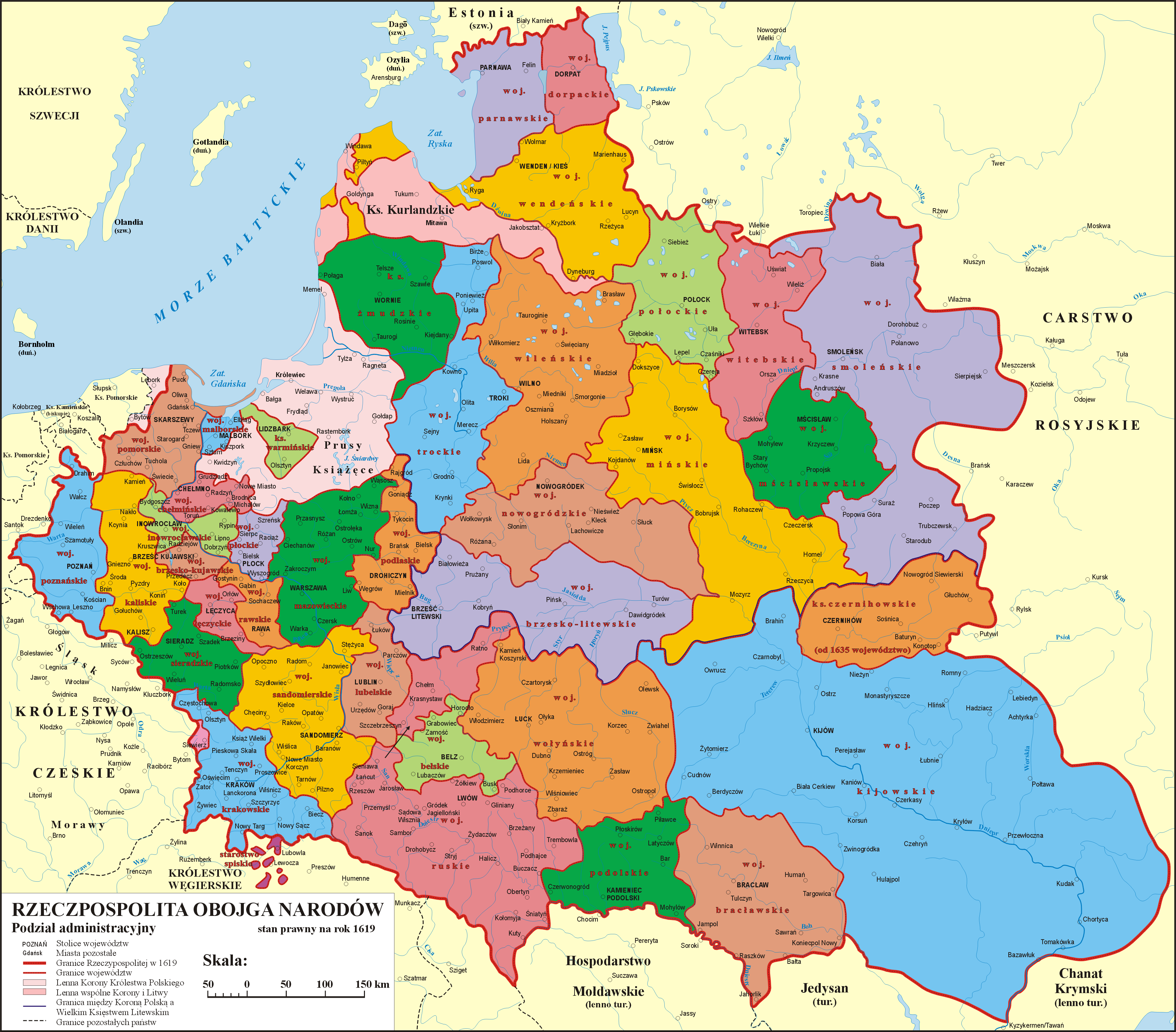
After 1569 Royal Prussia was fully integrated into the Kingdom of Poland and the Commonwealth.

In 1569, as a result of the Union of Lublin, which created the Polish-Lithuanian Commonwealth, Royal Prussia was integrated fully into the Kingdom of Poland, and its parliament was reduced to the status of a provincial assembly; also, other separate Prussian institutions were dissolved. Before the conclusion of the Union of Lublin, the Polish chancellor openly admitted that this act breached the law by violation of the privileges granted in 1454.

The former territory was subsequently governed as Pomeranian Voivodeship, Chełmno Voivodeship, Malbork Voivodeship, and Prince-Bishopric of Warmia.

=== Partitions ===
At the same time as the 1772 and 1793 (first and second partition of Poland), the former lands of Royal Prussia were annexed by the Kingdom of Prussia, the successor state of the Teutonic Order.

== See also ==
- Duchy of Prussia
- Kingdom of Prussia
- Partitioning of Prussia
- Pomerelia
- Kursenieki
- Kashubia
- Warmia
- The plague during the Great Northern War
