= List of people from the former eastern territories of Germany =

Numerous figures in German culture and history (some still living) were either born, resident, or spent a substantial part of their lives in the former eastern territories of Germany. A non-exhaustive list follows:

== Politicians, statesmen and diplomats ==
Catherine II, 1780s

=== 18th century ===
- Catherine the Great (1729 in Stettin – 1796 in Saint Petersburg) was Empress of Russia from 1762 to 1796, the country's longest-ruling female leader
- Friedrich Leopold Freiherr von Schrötter (1743 in Friedland – 1815 in Berlin) a German Junker, Prussian government minister and until 1806 Reichsfreiherr of the Holy Roman Empire
- Friedrich von Gentz (1764 in Breslau – 1832 in Vienna) a German diplomat and writer

=== 19th century ===
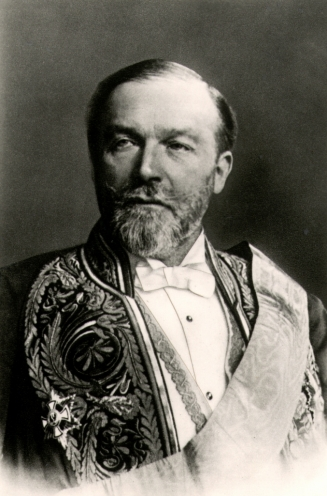
Philipp zu Eulenburg

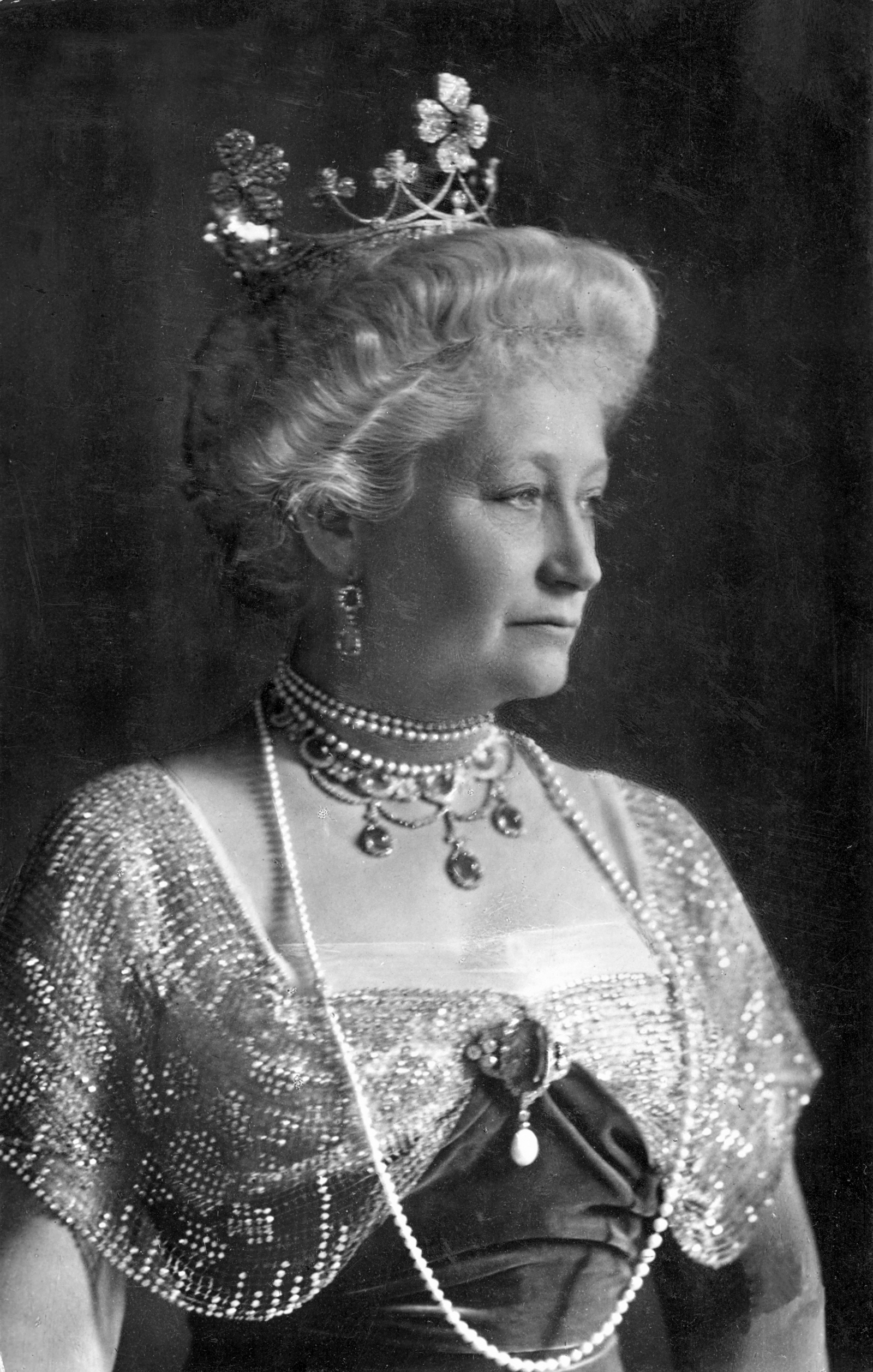
Kaiserin Auguste Viktoria

- Ferdinand Lassalle (1825 in Breslau – 1864 in Carouge) a German-Jewish jurist, philosopher, socialist and political activist, initiated international-style socialism in Germany
- Adalbert Falk (1827 in Metschkau – 1900 in Hamm) was a German politician and lawyer
- Eduard Lasker (1829 in Jarotschin – 1884 New York, United States) a German politician and jurist, inspired by the French Revolution, he became a spokesman for liberalism
- Leo von Caprivi (1831 in Berlin – 1899 in Skyren) an Imperial German Army general, served as Chancellor of Germany from 1890 to 1894
- Philipp, Prince of Eulenburg (1847 in Königsberg – 1921 in Liebenberg, Löwenberger Land) a diplomat and composer, close friend of Wilhelm II. He fell from power in 1907 due to the Harden–Eulenburg affair when he was accused of homosexuality.
- Elard von Oldenburg-Januschau (1855 in Beisleiden - 1937 in Marienwerder) was a German Junker and conservative German National People's Party politician
- Georg Michaelis (1857 in Haynau – 1936 in Bad Saarow) was Chancellor of Germany for a few months in 1917
- Augusta Victoria of Schleswig-Holstein (1858 in Dolzig Palace – 1921 in Huis Doorn, Netherlands) was the last German empress and queen of Prussia by marriage to Wilhelm II, German Emperor
- Walther von Lüttwitz (1859 in Bodland – 1942 in Breslau) a German general who fought in World War I, driving force behind the Kapp-Lüttwitz Putsch of 1920
- Karl Max, Prince Lichnowsky (1860 in Kreuzenort – Kuchelna 1928) was a German diplomat who served as Ambassador to Britain during the July Crisis in 1914
- Arthur Zimmermann (1864 in Marggrabowa – 1940 in Berlin) was State Secretary for Foreign Affairs of the German Empire from 22 November 1916/17, author of the intercepted and decoded Zimmermann Telegram
- Frederick Augustus III of Saxony (1865 in Dresden – 1932 in Sibyllenort) was the last King of Saxony (1904–1918) and a member of the House of Wettin
- Paul Hensel (1867 in Gehsen – 1944 in Kolberg) a German Lutheran theologian and politician, champion of the Masurians
- Otto Landsberg (1869 in Rybnick – 1957 in Baam, Netherlands) a German jurist, politician and diplomat, went to Versailles to receive Treaty of Versailles
- Gustav Bauer (1870 in Darkehmen – 1944 in Berlin) was a German Social Democratic Party leader and 11th Chancellor of Germany 1919 to 1920
- Wilhelm Pieck (1876 in eastern Guben – 1960 in East Berlin) German Communist Party politician, first President of the German Democratic Republic in 1949
- Reinhold Wulle (1882 in Falkenberg – 1950 in Gronau) a German journalist, anti-Semite and Völkisch politician

=== 20th century ===
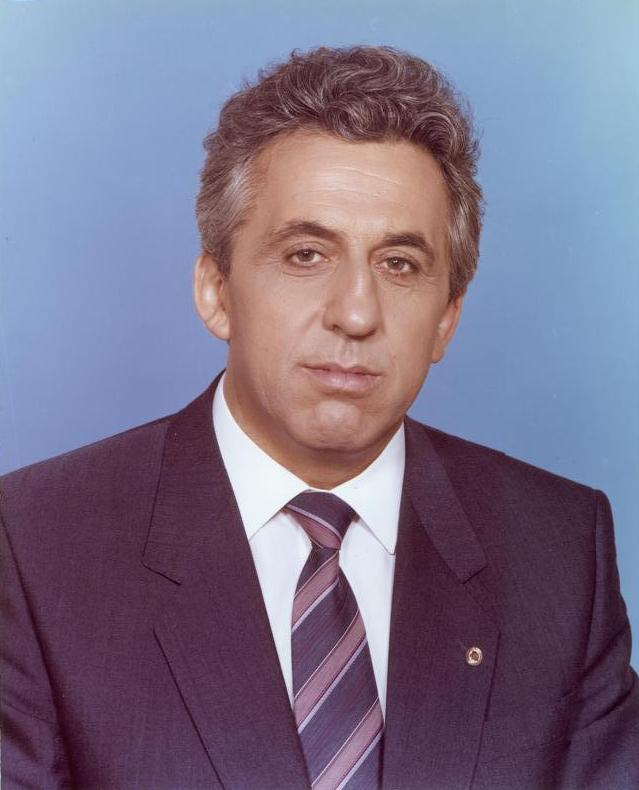
Egon Krenz

- Helmuth James Graf von Moltke (1907 in Kreisau – executed 1945) a German jurist, founder member of the Kreisau Circle
- Herbert Hupka (1915-2006) raised in Ratibor was a German-Jewish journalist, politician and advocate for the Germans expelled from neighbouring countries after World War II
- Hans Modrow (1928 in Jasenitz - 2023 in Berlin) a German politician, best known as the last Chairman of the Council of Ministers of East Germany
- Manfred Stolpe (1936 in Stettin - 2019 in Potsdam) was Federal Minister of Transport in the Federal Republic of Germany 2002/05
- Egon Krenz (born 1937 in Kolberg) a former East German politician who was the last President of East Germany in 1989
- Prince Franz Wilhelm of Prussia (born 1943 in Grünberg) is businessman and member of the House of Hohenzollern

== Military figures ==
=== Army ===
- Gebhard Leberecht von Blücher (1742 in Rostock – 1819 in Krieblowitz) a Prussian Army Generalfeldmarschall and co-victor over Napoleon at the Battle of Waterloo
- Johann David Ludwig Graf Yorck von Wartenburg (1759 in Potsdam – 1830 in Klein Öls) a Prussian Generalfeldmarschall influential in securing an alliance between Prussia and Russia during the War of the Sixth Coalition
- Hermann von Boyen (1771 in Kreuzburg – 15 February 1848) a Prussian army officer and minister of war of Prussia

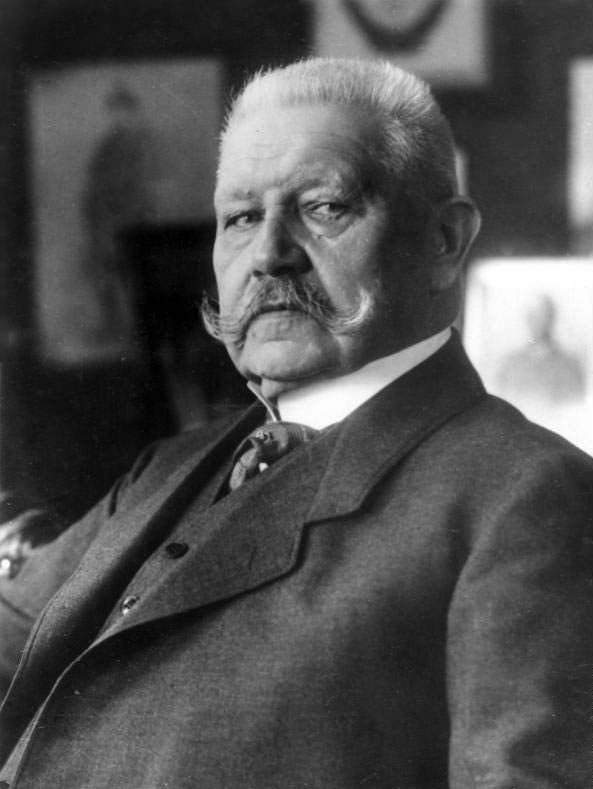
Paul v. Hindenburg

- Colmar Freiherr von der Goltz (1843 in Adlig Bielkenfeld – 1916 in Baghdad) a Prussian Field Marshal and military advisor to the Ottoman Army
- Kuno von Moltke (1847 in Neustrelitz – 1923 in Breslau) adjutant to Kaiser Wilhelm II and military commander of Berlin, was a principal in the homosexual scandal known as the Harden-Eulenburg Affair
- Paul von Hindenburg (1847 in Posen – 1934 in Neudeck) a German field-marshal in WWI and President of the German Reich in 1925 to 1934
- Hermann von Eichhorn (1848 in Breslau – 1918 in Kiev) was a Prussian officer, later Generalfeldmarschall during WWI
- Max von Gallwitz (1852 in Breslau – 1937 in Naples) a German general who served with distinction during WW1
- Fritz von Below (1853 in Danzig – 1918 in Weimar) a Prussian general in the German Army during WW1.
- Otto Liman von Sanders (1855 Stolp – 1929 in Munich) German general, adviser and military commander to the Ottoman Army
- Erich von Falkenhayn (1861 in Burg Belchau – 1922 in Potsdam) the Chief of the German General Staff in WWI 1914 to 1916
- Hans Feige (1880 in Königsberg – 1953 in Bad Schussenried) was a German General of the Infantry in the Wehrmacht in WWII
- Günther von Kluge (1882 in Posen – 1944 in Metz) a German field marshal during WWII
- Erich Fellgiebel (1886 in Pöpelwitz– executed 1944 in Berlin) a German Army general and a conspirator in the 20 July plot
- Heinz Guderian (1888 in Kulm – 1954 in Schwangau) a German general during WWII, the innovator and proponent of the blitzkrieg
- Walter Nehring (1892 in Stretzin – 1983) a German general in the Wehrmacht during WWII who commanded the Afrika Korps.
- Dietrich von Saucken (1892 in Fischhausen – 1980 in Pullach) a general in the Wehrmacht during WWII
- Hyacinth Graf Strachwitz (1893 in Gross Stein – 1968 in Trostberg) a German Army officer of aristocratic descent, served in WWI and WWII
- Hermann Balck (1893 in Danzig – 1982 in Asperg) a decorated officer of the German Army who served in both WWI and WWII
- Dietrich von Choltitz (1894 in Gräflich Wiese – 1966 in Baden-Baden) a German General, last military governor of Paris in WWII
- Walter Schilling (1895 in Chełmo – 1943 in Izium) a German general during WWII
- Heinrich Freiherr von Lüttwitz (1896 Krumpach – 1969 in Neuburg) a Prussian Junker, Olympic equestrian and German officer who served in both World Wars
- Friedrich von Mellenthin (1904 in Breslau – 1997 in Johannesburg) a German general during WWII
- Rochus Misch (1917 in Alt-Schalkowitz – 2013 in Berlin) last surviving occupant of the Führerbunker

=== Navy ===
- Fritz Berger (1900 in Allenstein - 1973 in Bielefeld), naval officer
- Alfred Saalwächter (1883 in Neusalz an der Oder - 1945 in Moscow), Generaladmiral U-boat commander

=== Air Force ===
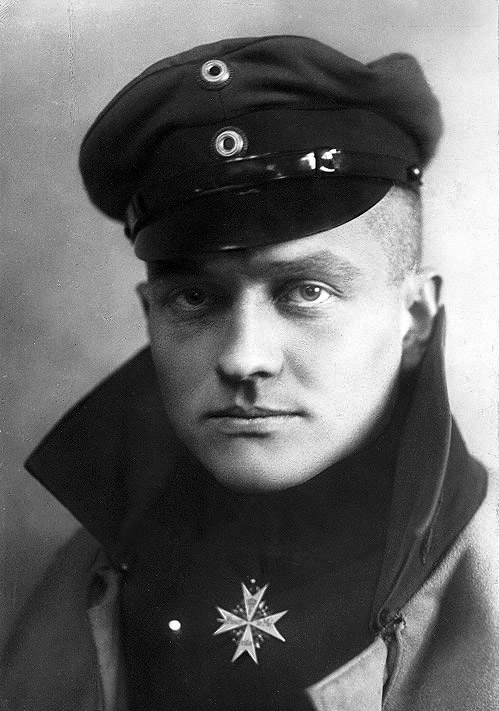
Manfred von Richthofen

- Walther Wever (1887 in Wilhelmsort – 1936 in Dresden) a pre-WWII Luftwaffe Commander, proponent of strategic bombing
- Kurt Student (1890 in Birkholz – 1978 in Lemgo) a German Fallschirmjäger general in the Luftwaffe during WWII
- Manfred von Richthofen (1892 in Breslau – 1918 near Vaux-sur-Somme), also known as the Red Baron, was a fighter pilot with the German Air Force during WWI, considered the ace-of-aces with 80 air combat victories.
- Kurt Wintgens (1894 Neustadt in Oberschlesien – 1916 in Villers-Carbonnel) was a German WWI fighter ace
- Max Näther (1899 Lauenbrunn – 1919 in Kolmar in Posen) a German WWI ace fighter pilot, probably the youngest
- Melitta Schenk Gräfin von Stauffenberg (1903 in Krotoschin – 1945 in Straubing) an aviator who served as a test pilot in the Luftwaffe in WWII
- Rudolf Schoenert (1911 in Glogau – 1985 in Manitoba) night fighter flying ace in the German Luftwaffe during WWII
- Hanna Reitsch (1912 in Hirschberge – 1979 in Frankfurt a/M) Germany's most famous female aviator and test pilot
- Hans-Jürgen Stumpff (1889 in Kolberg - 1968 in Frankfurt am Main) a German air forces general who signed the unconditional surrender in 1945
- Günther Radusch (1912 in Schwetz – 1988 in Nordstrand) a German pilot in the German Luftwaffe during WWII
- Wolf-Dietrich Wilcke (1913 in Schrimm – 1944 in Schöppenstedt) a German Luftwaffe pilot during WWII and fighter ace
- Hans-Ulrich Rudel (1916 in Konradswaldau – 1982 in Rosenheim) a German ground-attack pilot during WWII and prominent neo-Nazi activist in Latin America
- Helmut Lent (1918 Pyrehne – 1944 in Paderborn) a German night-fighter ace in WWII.
- Joachim Müncheberg (1918 in Friedrichsdorf – 1943 in Tunisia) a German Luftwaffe military aviator during WWII and fighter ace
- Gerhard Barkhorn (1919 in Königsberg – 1983 in Frechen) the second most successful fighter ace
- Walter Krupinski (1920 in Domnau – 2000 in Neunkirchen-Seelscheid) a Bundeswehr general and a fighter pilot in the Luftwaffe in WWII
- Paul Zorner (1920 in Roben – 2014 in Homburg) a German night fighter pilot, who fought in the Luftwaffe in WW II
- Wolfgang Martini (1891 in Lissa - 1963 in Düsseldorf), Luftwaffe officer, promoted the use of radar in the German Air Force

=== Waffen-SS ===
- Felix Steiner (1896 in Stallupönen – 1966 in Munich) an Obergruppenführer in the Waffen-SS during WWII
- Kurt Daluege (1897 in Kreuzburg – executed 1946 in Prague) Deputy Protector for the Protectorate of Bohemia and Moravia
- Erich von dem Bach-Zelewski (1899 in Lauenburg – 1972 in Munich) in 1944 he led the brutal suppression of the Warsaw Uprising
- Werner Ostendorff (1903 in Königsberg - 1945 in Bad Aussee) was a German SS-general in WWII, served as chief of staff of the II SS Panzer Corps

=== Espionage ===
- Renate von Natzmer (1898 in Borkow – beheaded 1935 in Berlin) German noblewoman who worked for Polish intelligence
- Max Otto Koischwitz (1902 – 1944) a naturalized American of German origin who broadcast Nazi propaganda during WWII
- Wolfgang Vogel (1925 in Wilhelmsthal – 2008 in Schliersee) East German lawyer, brokered spy exchanges during the Cold War

== Scientists and mathematicians ==
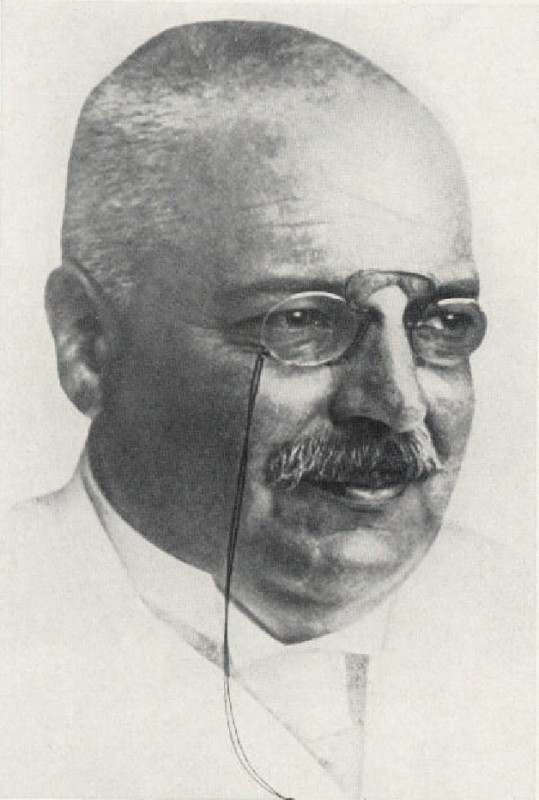
Alois Alzheimer

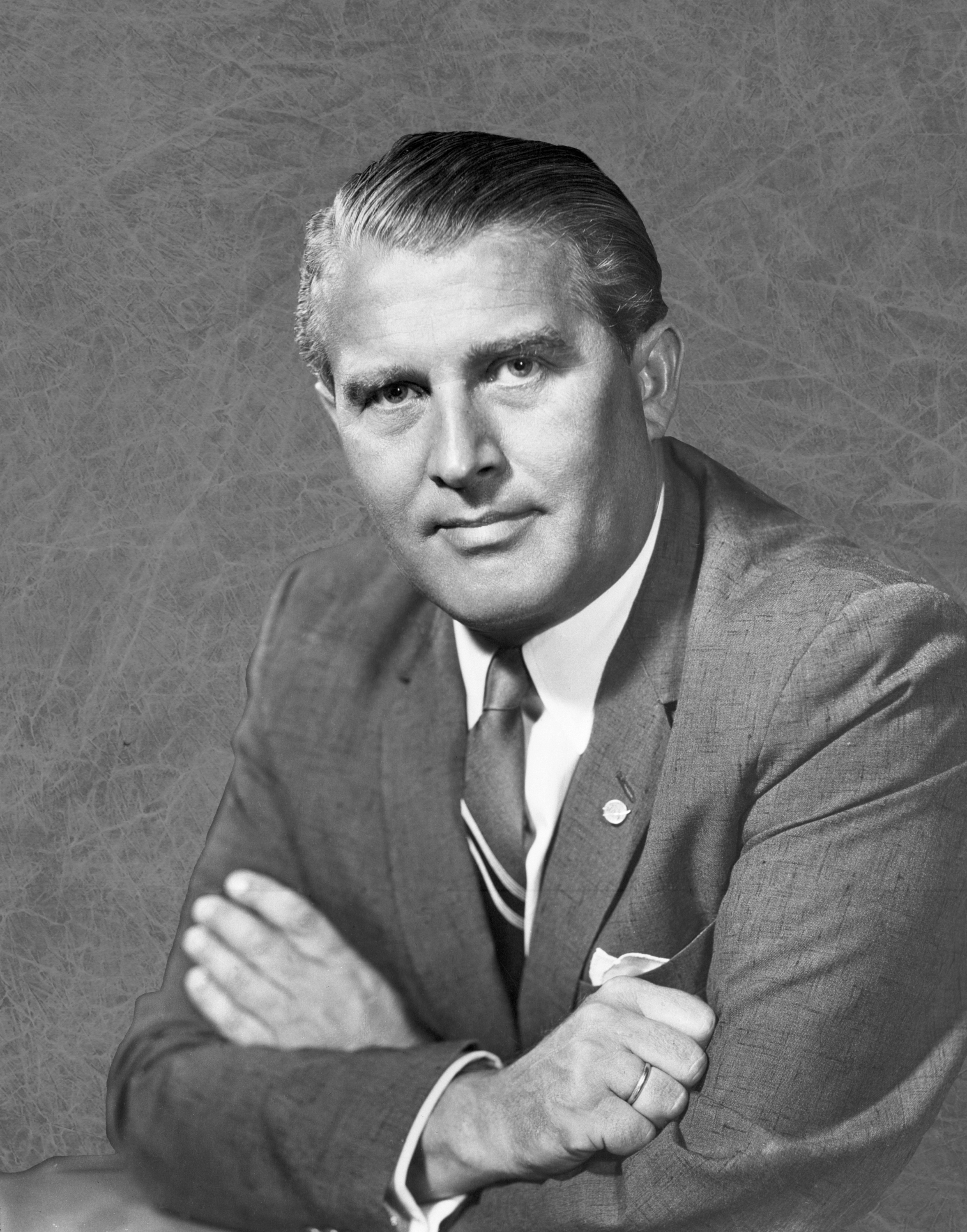
Wernher von Braun, 1960

- Ehrenfried Walther von Tschirnhaus (1651 in Kieslingswalde – 1708 in Dresden) a German mathematician, physicist, physician and philosopher
- Friedrich Wilhelm von Reden (1752 in Hamelin - 1815 in Schloss Buchwald), mining engineer and government official who contributed to the industrialisation of Silesia
- Karl Godulla (1781 in Makoschau - 1848 in Breslau) industrialist, the "King of Zinc", industrialised Silesia
- Heinrich Göppert (1800 in Sprottau – 1884 in Breslau) a German botanist, paleontologist and paleobotanist
- Ferdinand Schichau (1814 in Elbing – 1896 in Elbing) a German mechanical engineer and businessman
- Hermann Brehmer (1826 in Strehlen – 1889 in Görbersdorf) a German physician who established the first German sanatorium for the systematic open-air treatment of tuberculosis in Görbersdorf
- Ferdinand Cohn (1828 in Breslau – 1898) a German biologist, one of the founders of modern bacteriology and microbiology.
- Ferdinand von Richthofen (1833 in Bad Carlsruhe in O.S – 1905 in Berlin) better known in English as Baron von Richthofen, was a German traveller, geographer and scientist.
- Paul Ehrlich (1854 in Strehlen – 1915 in Bad Homburg) a German Jewish physician and scientist who worked on hematology, immunology, and antimicrobial chemotherapy
- Paul Gottlieb Nipkow (1860 in Lauenburg in Pommern – 1940 in Berlin) was a German technician and inventor of the Nipkow disk
- David Hilbert (1862 in Wehlau – 1943 in Göttingen) was a German mathematician, developed invariant theory and the axiomatization of geometry
- Hugo Münsterberg (1863 in Danzig – 1916 USA) a German-American psychologist, pioneer in applied psychology
- Johannes Thienemann (1863 – 1938 in Rossitten) a German ornithologist who in 1901 established the Rossitten Bird Observatory, the world's first, on the Curonian Spit
- Alois Alzheimer (1864–1915 in Breslau) a German psychiatrist and neuropathologist, identified "presenile dementia", later called Alzheimer's disease
- Walther Nernst (1864 in Briesen – 1941 in Zibelle) a German chemist, worked on thermodynamics, won the 1920 Nobel Prize in Chemistry
- Emil Krebs (1867 in Freiburg in Schlesien – 1930 in Berlin) a German polyglot and sinologist
- Fritz Haber (1868 in Breslau – 1934 in Basel) a German chemist, won the Nobel Prize in Chemistry in 1918 for his invention of the Haber–Bosch process
- Georg von Arco (1869 in Großgorschütz – 1940 in Berlin) a German physicist, radio pioneer and joint founder of Telefunken
- Max Born (1882 in Breslau – 1970 in Göttingen) a German physicist and mathematician who was instrumental in the development of quantum mechanics
- Edward Sapir (1884 in Lauenburg – 1939 USA) a Prussian-American anthropologist-linguist, important figure in linguistics
- Gerhard Domagk (1895 in Lagow – 1964 in Burgberg) a German pathologist and bacteriologist, discovered the first commercially available antibiotic (Prontosil) and received the 1939 Nobel Prize in Physiology or Medicine
- Maria Goeppert-Mayer (1906 in Kattowitz – 1972 USA) a German-born American theoretical physicist, won the 1963 Nobel Prize in Physics for proposing the nuclear shell model of the atomic nucleus
- Wernher von Braun (1912 in Wirsitz – 1977 USA) a German, later American, aerospace engineer and space architect, invented the V-2 rocket for Nazi Germany and the Saturn V for the United States
- Günter Blobel (born 1936 in Waltersdorf) a Silesian German biologist and winner of the 1999 Nobel Prize in Physiology
- Klaus Clusius (1903 in Breslau - 1963 in Zürich), physical chemist who worked on Germany's abortive nuclear weapon project

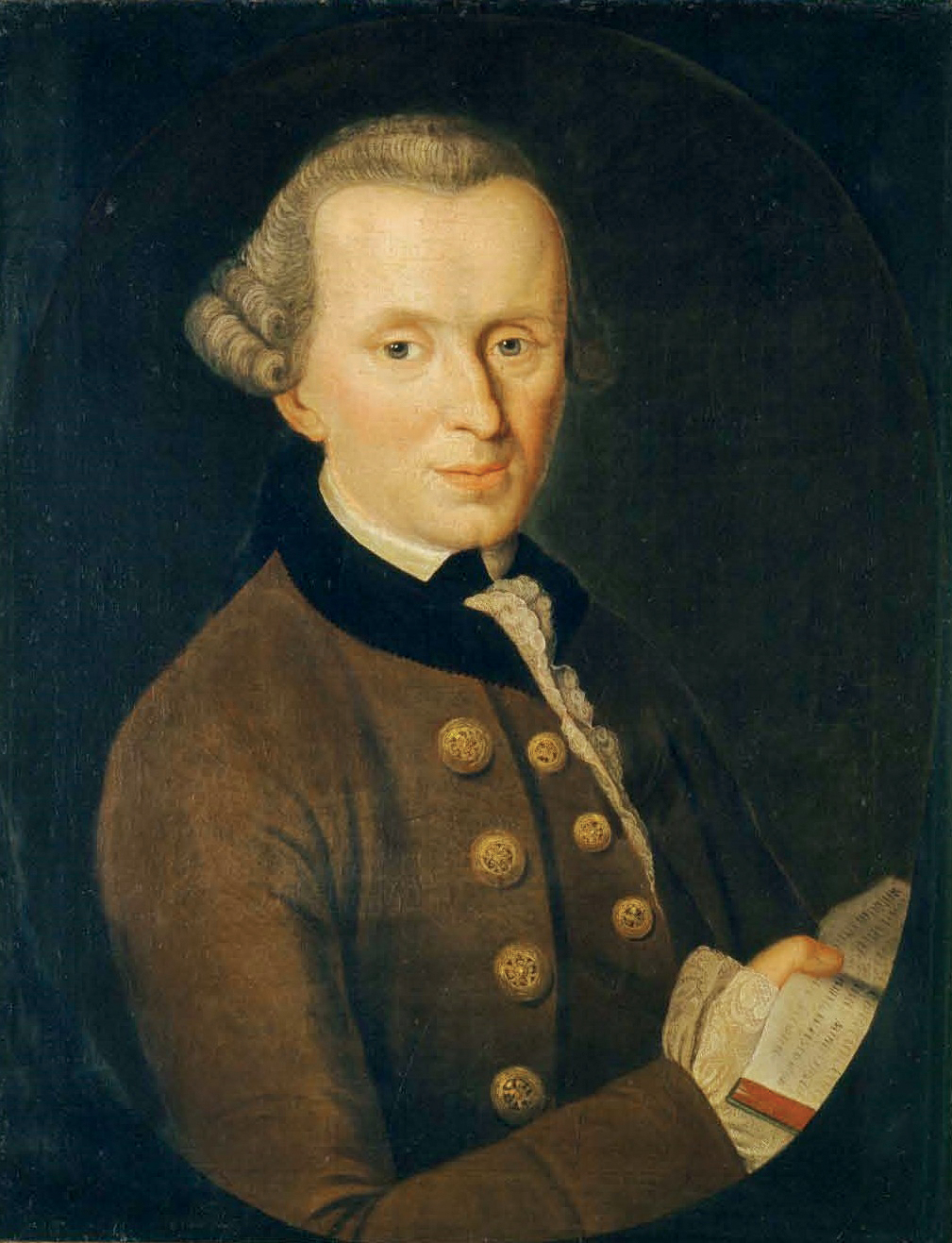
Immanuel Kant

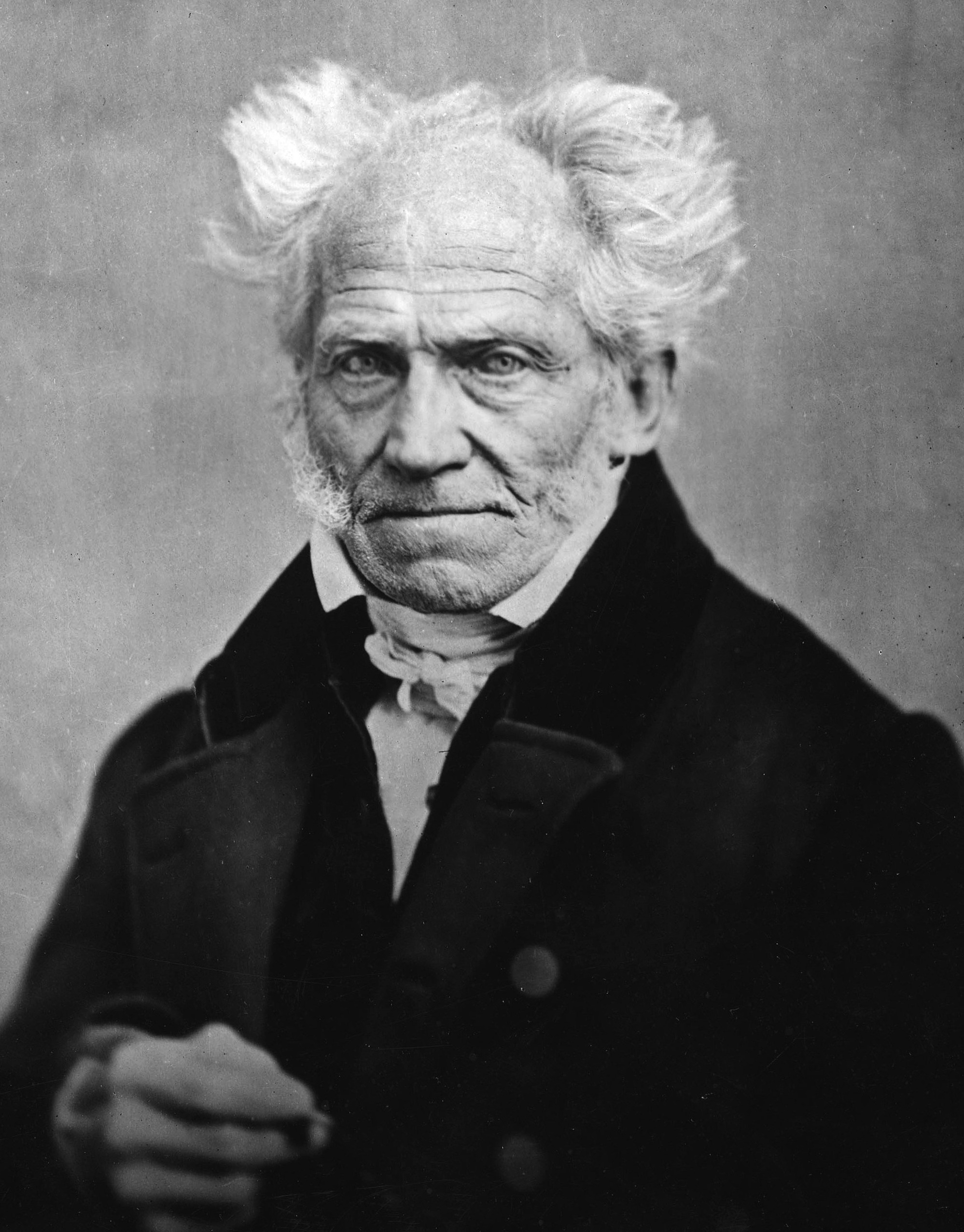
Arthur Schopenhauer, 1859

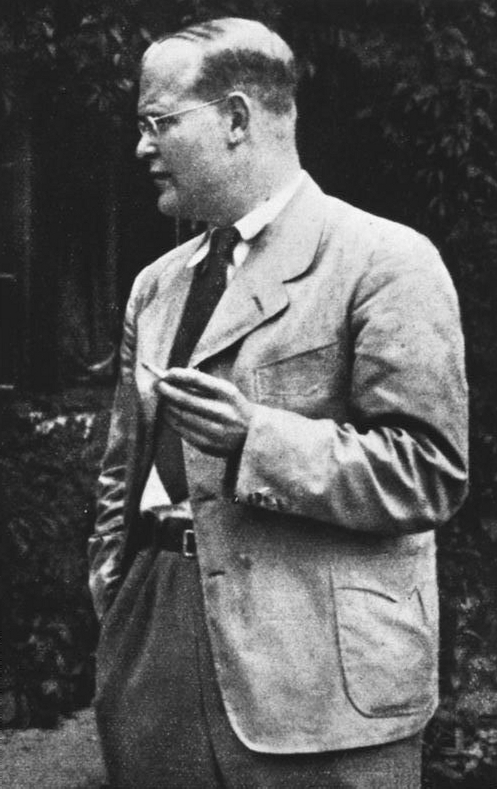
Dietrich Bonhoeffer

== Philosophers and theologians ==
- George of Polentz (1478 - 1550 in Burg Balga) was the first Lutheran bishop
- Immanuel Kant (1724 in Königsberg – 1804 in Königsberg) a German philosopher and a central figure in the Enlightenment and modern philosophy
- Johann Georg Hamann (1730 in Königsberg – 1788 in Münster) a German philosopher, theologian and philologist
- Johann Gottfried Herder (1744 in Mohrungen – 1803 in Weimar) was a German philosopher, theologian, poet and literary critic
- Arthur Schopenhauer (1788 in Danzig – 1860 in Frankfurt) a German philosopher, an atheistic metaphysical and ethical pessimist
- Friedrich Daniel Ernst Schleiermacher (1768 Breslau – 1834 in Berlin) a German theologian, philosopher and biblical scholar known for developing field of hermeneutics
- Karl Gützlaff (1803 at Pyritz – 1851 in Hong Kong) a German Lutheran missionary to the Far East
- Paul Hensel (1860 in Groß-Barthen near Königsberg – 1930 in Erlangen) a German philosopher and professor at the University of Heidelberg
- Dietrich Bonhoeffer (1906 in Breslau– in 1945 Flossenbürg) was a German Confessing Church pastor, theologian, spy and anti-Nazi dissident
- Paul Tillich (1886 in Starzeddel - 1965 in Chicago), German-American philosopher and theologian

== Historians and archaeologists ==
- Heinrich Graetz (1817 in Xions – 1891 in Munich) an historian, wrote a history of the Jewish people from a Jewish perspective.
- Gottfried Bernhardy (1800 in Landsberg an der Warthe – 1875) German philologist and literary historian
- Ferdinand von Roemer (1818 in Hildesheim – 1891 in Breslau) geologist, he formed a mineralogy collection in the Museum at Breslau
- Arthur Milchhöfer (1852 in Schirwindt – 1903) was a German archaeologist
- Otto Jaekel (1863 in Neusalz – 1929 in Beijing) was a German paleontologist and geologist.
- Fritz Gause (1893 – 1973) German historian, archivist and curator wrote a three-volume history of Königsberg
- Bolko von Richthofen (1899 in Mertschütz – 1983) German archaeologist
- Theodor Schieder (1908 – 1984) German historian, moved to Königsberg in 1934 at the age of 26
- Walter Bruno Henning (1908 in Ragnit – 1967 USA) a German scholar of Middle Iranian languages and literature

== Musicians ==
=== Classical ===
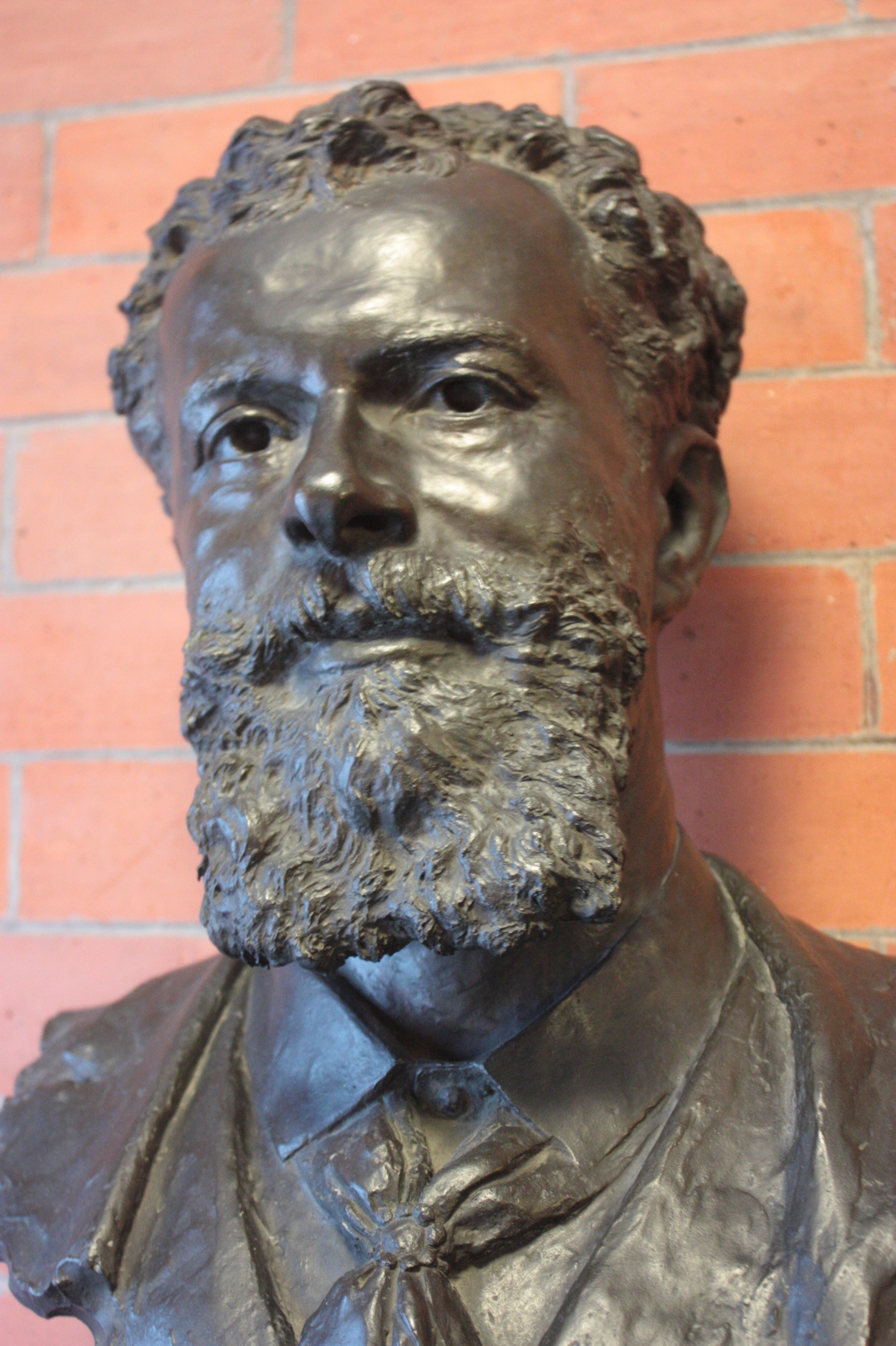
George Henschel

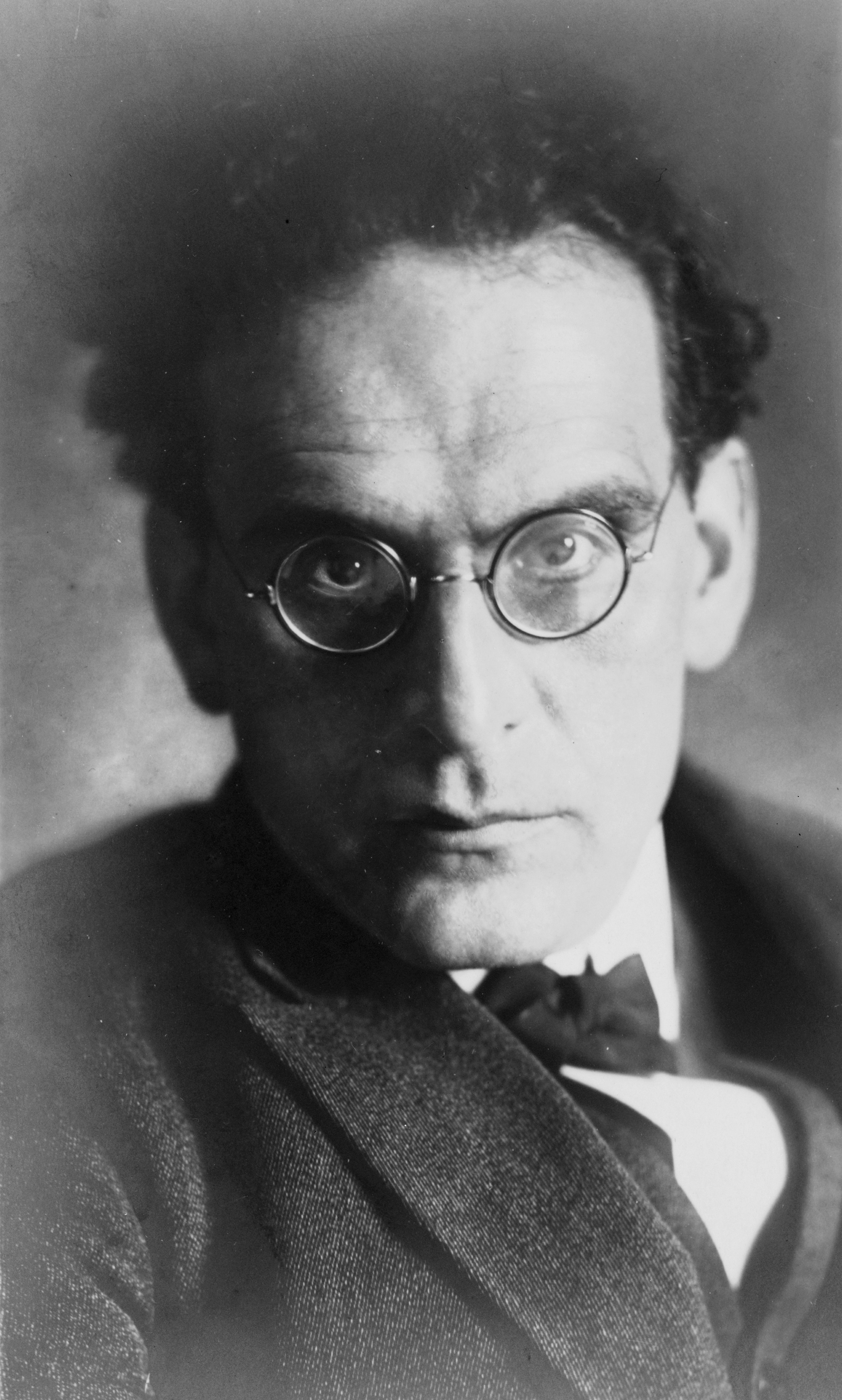
Otto Klemperer

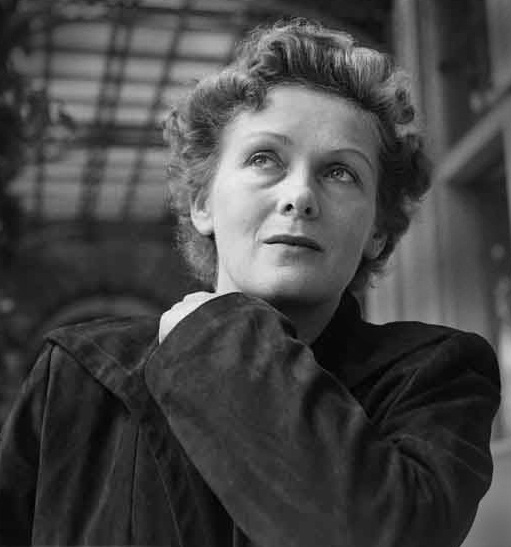
Elisabeth Schwarzkopf

- Georg Riedel (1676 - in Königsberg - 1738 in Königsberg) was a German composer and cantor. He has been referred to as the "East Prussian Bach"
- Sylvius Leopold Weiss (1687 in Grottkau – 1750 in Dresden) a German composer and lutenist.
- Johann Friedrich Reichardt (1752 in Königsberg – 1814 in Giebichenstein near Halle) a German composer, writer and music critic.
- Franz von Oppersdorff (1778 in Oberglogau - 1818) a Silesian nobleman and a great lover of music, who commissioned Beethoven's Fourth and Fifth Symphonies
- Johann Sedlatzek (1789 in Oberglogau – 1866 in Vienna) a Silesian flautist born into a family of tailors
- Carl Loewe (1796 in Löbejün – 1869 in Kiel) a German composer, tenor singer and conductor, worked in Stettin for 46 years
- Otto Nicolai (1810 in Königsberg – 1849 in Berlin) a German composer, conductor and founder of the Vienna Philharmonic
- Johann Gottfried Piefke (1817 in Schwerin an der Warthe – 1884 in Frankfurt an der Oder) a German conductor, Kapellmeister and composer of military music
- Wilhelm Joseph von Wasielewski (1822 in Groß-Leesen – 1896 in Sondershausen) a German violinist, conductor and musicologist
- Philipp Scharwenka (1847 in Samter – 1917 in Bad Nauheim) a German composer and teacher of music
- Sir George Henschel (1850 in Breslau – 1934 in Aviemore) a German-born British baritone, pianist, conductor and composer
- Xaver Scharwenka (1850 in Samter – 1924 in Berlin) a German pianist, composer and teacher of Bohemian-Polish descent
- Franz Eckert (1852 in Neurode - 1916 in Keijo, Japanese Korea), arranged the melody of Kimigayo, the Japanese national anthem
- Moritz Moszkowski (1854 in Breslau – 1925 in Paris) a German-Jewish composer, pianist and teacher
- Richard Wetz (1875 in Gleiwitz – 1935 in Erfurt) a German late Romantic composer best known for his three symphonies
- Otto Klemperer (1885 in Breslau – 1973 in Zurich) a German-born conductor and composer, widely regarded as one of the leading conductors of the 20th century
- Dame Elisabeth Schwarzkopf DBE (1915 in Jarotschin – 2006 in Schruns) a German soprano, amongst the foremost singers of lieder and was renowned for her performances of Viennese operetta; one of the greatest sopranos of the 20th Century
- Kurt Masur (1927 in Brieg – 2015 USA) a German conductor, Kapellmeister of the Gewandhaus and music director of the New York Philharmonic

=== Modern ===
- Kurt Demmler (1943–2009), songwriter; accused of sexual abuse he hanged himself in his jail cell.
- John Kay (born 1944 in Tilsit is a German-Canadian rock singer, songwriter and guitarist known as the frontman of Steppenwolf
- Edgar Froese (1944 in Tilsit – 2015 in Vienna) a German artist and electronic music pioneer, founded the electronic music group Tangerine Dream
- Alexandra (1942 in Heydekrug - 1969), singer
- Oskar Gottlieb Blarr (born 1934 in Sandlack), organist and composer

== Poets, writers and dramatists ==
=== Poets ===
- Martin Opitz von Boberfeld (1597 in Bunzlau – 1639 in Danzig) a German poet, seen as the greatest of the nation in his lifetime
- Friedrich von Logau (1605 in Brockut – 1655 in Liegnitz) a German poet and epigrammatist of the Baroque era.
- Andreas Gryphius (1616 in Glogau – 1664 in Glogau) a German lyric poet and dramatist
- Angelus Silesius (c.1624 in Breslau – 1677 in Breslau) a German Catholic priest, physician, mystic and religious poet.
- Ewald Christian von Kleist (1715 in Groß-Poplow – 1759 in Frankfurt (Oder)) a German poet and cavalry officer
- Max von Schenkendorf (1783 in Tilsit – 1817 in Koblenz) a German poet educated at Königsberg and writer of patriotic songs.
- Joseph Freiherr von Eichendorff (1788 in Ratibor – 1857 in Neiße) a Prussian poet, novelist, playwright and literary critic

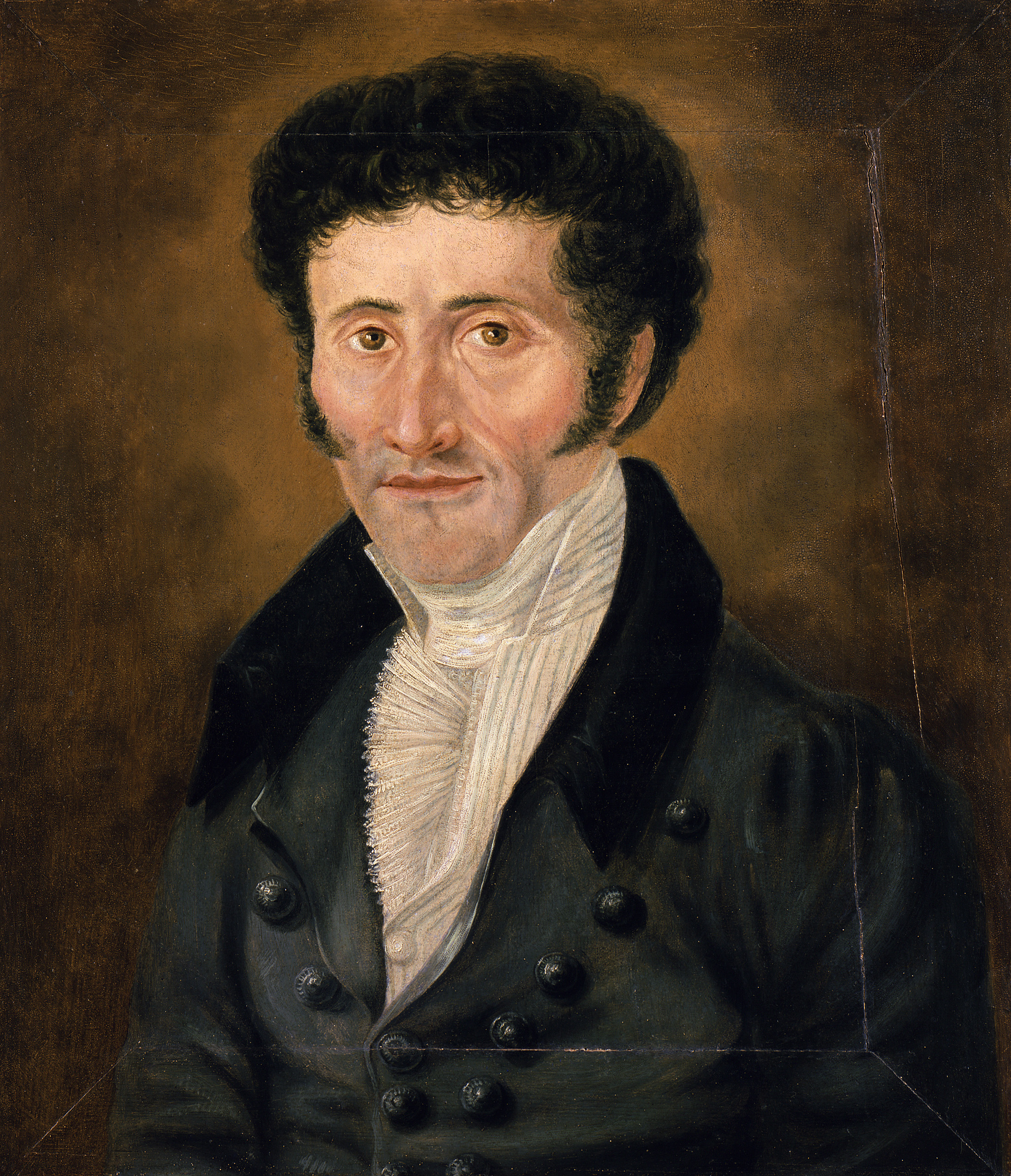
E. T. A. Hoffmann

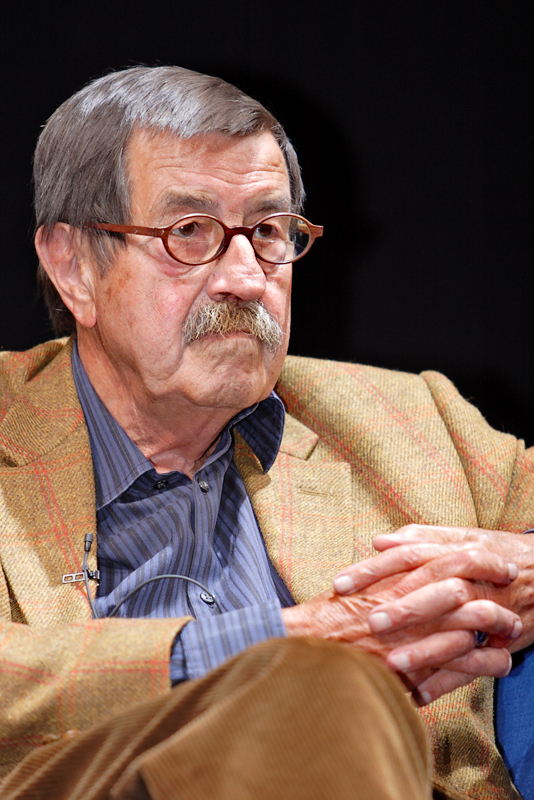
Günter Grass, 2006

=== Writers ===
- E. T. A. Hoffmann (1776 in Königsberg – 1822 in Berlin) a Prussian Romantic author of fantasy and Gothic horror, a jurist, composer, music critic, draftsman and caricaturist
- Bogumil Goltz (1801–1870) a German humorist and satirist, schooled in Marienwerder and Königsberg, lived in Gollub
- Gustav Freytag (1816 in Kreuzburg – 1895 in Wiesbaden) a German novelist and playwright.
- Gerhart Hauptmann (1862 in Ober Salzbrunn – 1946 in Agnetendorf) a German dramatist and novelist. He received the Nobel Prize in Literature in 1912.
- Alfred Döblin (1878 in Stettin – 1957 in Emmendingen) a German novelist, essayist and doctor
- Arnold Zweig (1887 in Glogau – 1968 in East Berlin) a German writer and anti-war and antifascist activist
- Marion Dönhoff (1909 in Schloss Friedrichstein – 2002) a German journalist who worked for over 55 years for the Hamburg-based, weekly newspaper Die Zeit, as an editor and later publisher.
- Siegfried Lenz (1926 in Lyck – 2014 in Hamburg) a German writer of novels, short stories and essays
- Günter Grass (1927 in Danzig – 2015 in Lübeck) a German novelist, poet, playwright, illustrator, graphic artist and sculptor, recipient of the Nobel Prize in Literature in 1999
- Janosch, (born 1931 in Hindenburg) is one of the best-known German children's book authors and illustrators
- Algis Budrys (1931 in Königsberg - 2008 in Evanston, Illinois), Lithuanian-American science fiction writer. His father was the Lithuanian consul in Königsberg at the time of his birth.

== Painters and visual artists ==
- Michael Willmann (1630 in Königsberg – 1706 in Leubus) a German painter and Baroque artist, "the Silesian Rembrandt"
- Karl Friedrich Lessing (1808 in Breslau - 1880 in Karlsruhe) a German historical and landscape painter
- Adolph Menzel (1815 in Breslau – 1905 in Berlin) a German Realist artist noted for drawings, etchings and paintings.
- Lovis Corinth (1858 in Tapiau – 17 July 1925 in Zandvoort) a German artist and writer, he realized a synthesis of impressionism and expressionism.
- Käthe Kollwitz (1867 in Königsberg – 1945 in Moritzburg) a German artist, who worked with painting, printmaking and sculpture.
- Alfred Partikel (1888 in Goldap - date of death unknown) a German artist

== Architects ==
- Georg Wenzeslaus von Knobelsdorff (1699 in Kuckädel – 1753 in Berlin) designed Berlin's Sanssouci Palace
- Carl Gotthard Langhans (1732 in Landeshut – 1808 in Grüneiche) designer of the Brandenburg Gate
- Carl Ferdinand Langhans (1782 in Breslau – 1869 in Berlin) built among others the Breslau Opera
- Max Berg (1870 in Stettin – 1947 in Baden-Baden) was designer of the Centennial Hall in Breslau
- Friedrich Lahrs (1880 in Königsberg – 1964 in Stuttgart) designed the Kunsthalle Königsberg (completed 1913) in Tragheim
- Richard Konwiarz (1883 in Karlshausen – 1960 in Hanover) designed the Silesian Arena, now the Olympic Stadium in Wrocław
- Erich Mendelsohn (1887 in Allenstein) – 1953 in San Francisco) was a Jewish German architect, known for his expressionist architecture in the 1920s
- Hanns Hopp (1890 in Lübeck - 1971 in East Berlin) lived in Königsberg and designed many public and private buildings there
- Bruno Taut (1880 in Königsberg - 1938 in İstanbul)

== Film, TV and theatre ==
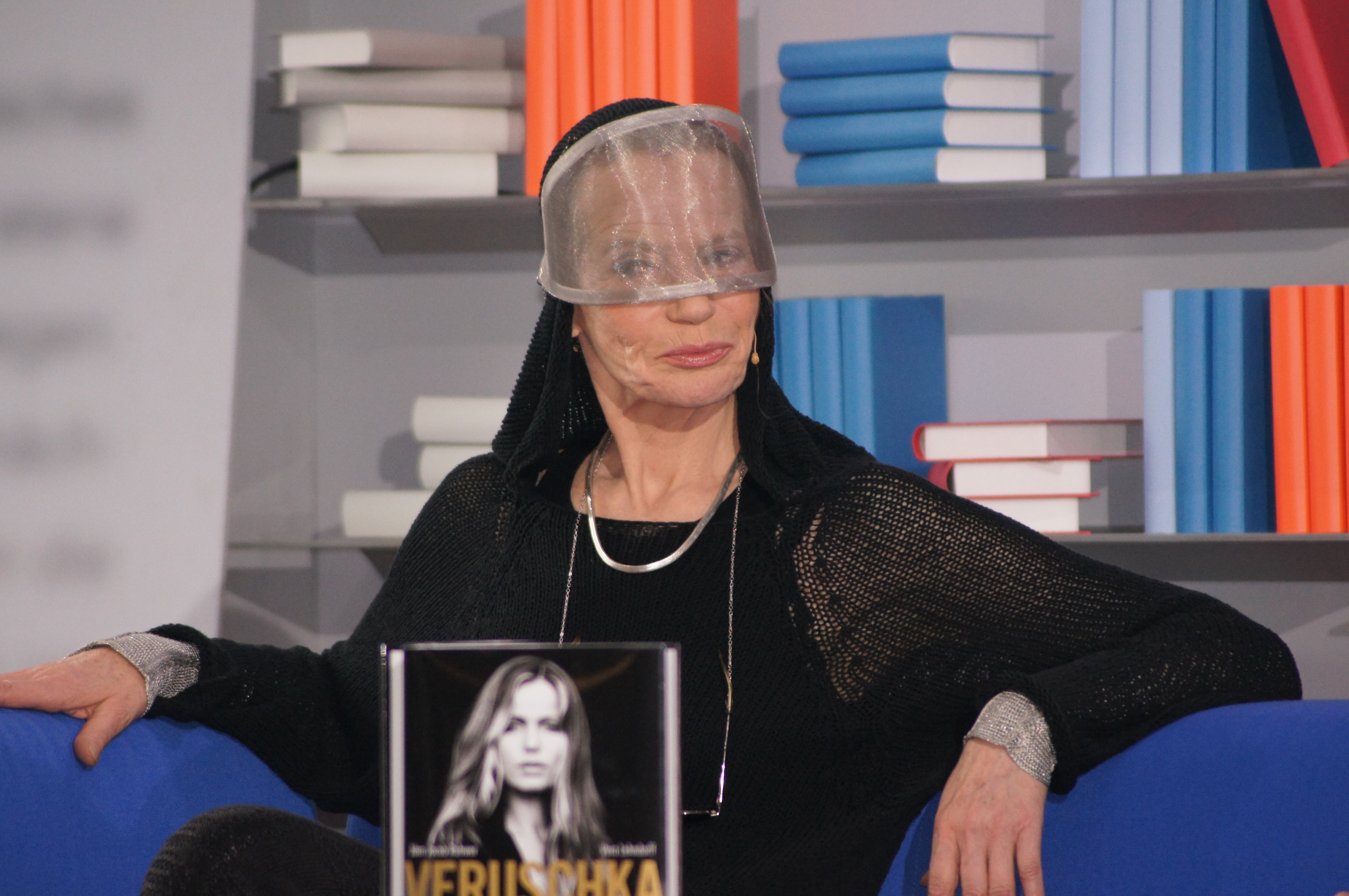
Veruschka Gräfin von Lehndorff, 2011

- Robert Wiene (1873 in Breslau – 1938 in Paris) a film director of the German silent cinema of expressionist films
- Hans Heinrich von Twardowski (1898 in Stettin – 1958 in New York) was a German film actor
- Armin Mueller-Stahl (born 1930 in Tilsit) is a German film actor, painter and author, lives in Los Angeles
- Marianne Hold (1933 in Johannisburg – 1994 in Lugano) was a German movie actress, popular in the 1950s and 1960
- Veruschka von Lehndorff (born 1939 in Königsberg) a German model, actress and artist, popular in the 1960s
- Matthias Habich (born 1940 in Danzig) is a German actor, lives in Paris
- Volker Lechtenbrink (1944 in Cranz - 1921 in Hamburg) German television actor and singer
- Ludwig Manfred Lommel (1891 in Jauer - 1962 in Bad Nauheim) actor
- Ruth Lommel (1918 in Breslau - 2012 in Mönchengladbach) actress
- Ulli Lommel (1944 in Zielenzig - 2017 in Stuttgart) a German actor and director, collaborated with Rainer Werner Fassbinder
- Agnes Sorma (born 1862 in Breslau - 1927 in Arizona), stage actress

== Miscellaneous ==
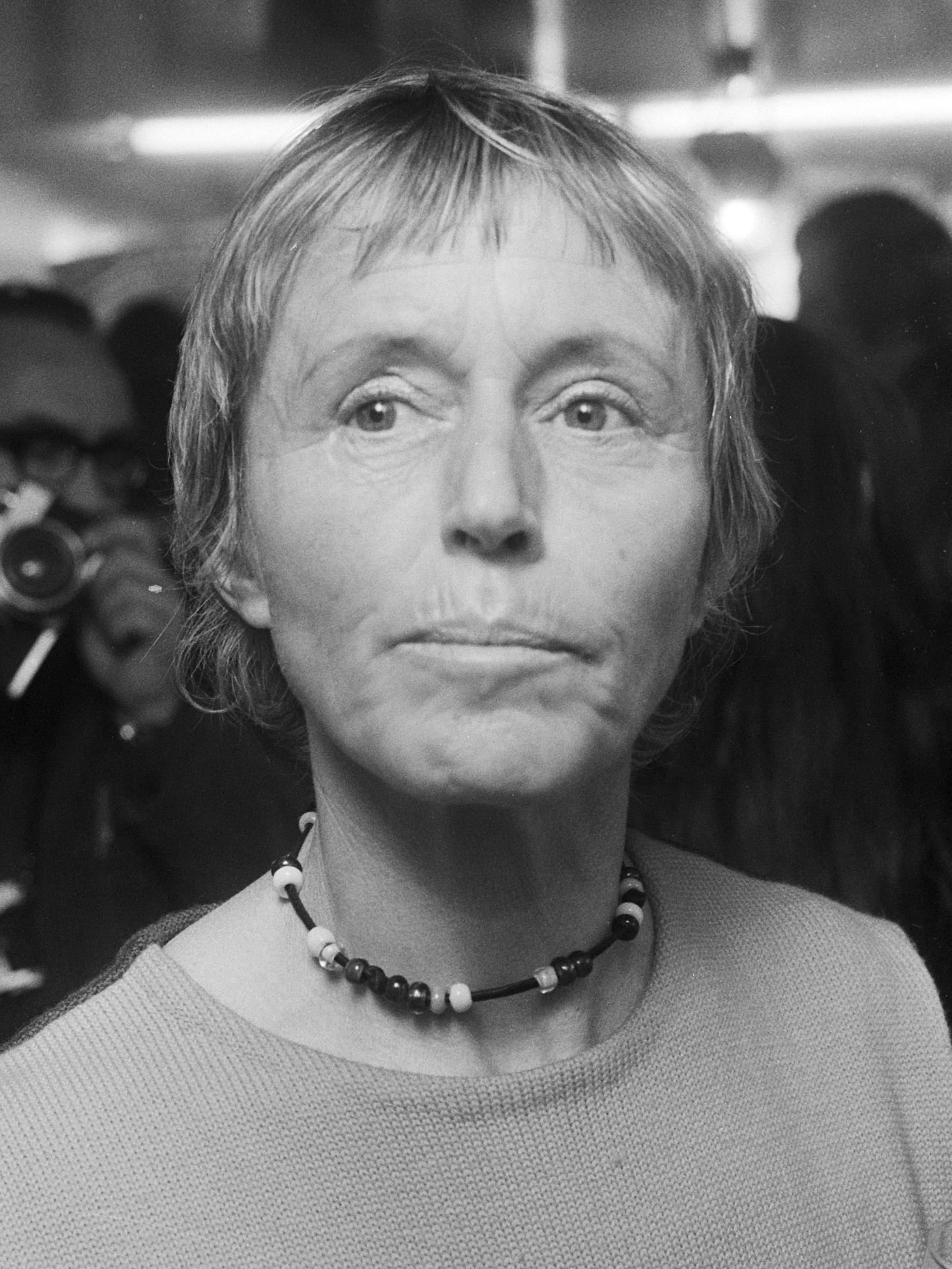
Beate Uhse, 1971

- Sophie Ursinus (1760 in Glatz – 1836 in Glatz) serial killer
- Karl Denke (1860 in Münsterberg – 1924 in Münsterberg) a notorious cannibalistic serial killer in Silesia
- Emanuel Lasker (1868 in Berlinchen – 1941 USA) was a German chess player, mathematician and philosopher
- Herbert Meinhard Mühlpfordt (1893 in Königsberg – 1982 in Lübeck) a German internist, art historian and cultural historian.
- Sir Ludwig Guttmann CBE FRS (1899 in Tost – 1980 in Aylesbury) founder of the Paralympic Games
- Paul Mross (1910 in Bismarckhütte – 1991 in Düsseldorf) was a Polish–German chess master
- Herta Heuwer (1913 in Königsberg – 1999 in Berlin) inventor of the currywurst
- Beate Uhse-Rotermund (1919 in Cranz – 2001 in St Gallen) aviator and founder of the world's first sex shop, Beate Uhse AG
- Hardy Rodenstock (1941 in Marienwerder - 2018 Oberaudorf) publisher, wine connoisseur and suspected wine fraudster
- Manfred Schaefer (1943 in Pillau - 2023 in Sydney), German-Australian footballer
- Lorenz Schwietz (1850 in Groß Döbern - 1925 in Breslau) executioner; most of his executions were carried out in Prussian cities east of the Oder
- Ottilie von Goethe (1796 in Danzig - 1872 in Weimar) socialite, daughter-in-law of Johann Wolfgang von Goethe

== See also ==
- List of people from Breslau
- List of people born in the Free City of Danzig
- List of people from Königsberg
- List of people from Stettin
