= Targowica =

Targowica may refer to:

- Targowica Confederation of 1792, which opposed the Polish Constitution of 1791
  - Targowica/Torgovitsya, once a town now a village in Ukraine, claimed as the place of the above confederation (actually held in Saint Petersburg)
- Targowica, Lower Silesian Voivodeship, a village in Lower Silesian Voivodeship (SW Poland)
