= Vilémovice =

Vilémovice may refer to places in the Czech Republic:

- Vilémovice (Blansko District), a municipality and village in the South Moravian Region
- Vilémovice (Havlíčkův Brod District), a municipality and village in the Vysočina Region
- Vilémovice, a village and part of Červené Janovice in the Central Bohemian Region

== See also ==
- Vilémov (disambiguation)
- Wilamowice (disambiguation)
