= Baldwinowice =

Baldwinowice may refer to the following places in Poland:

- Baldwinowice, Lower Silesian Voivodeship (south-west Poland)
- Baldwinowice, Opole Voivodeship (south-west Poland)
