= Dobrzenice =

- Village
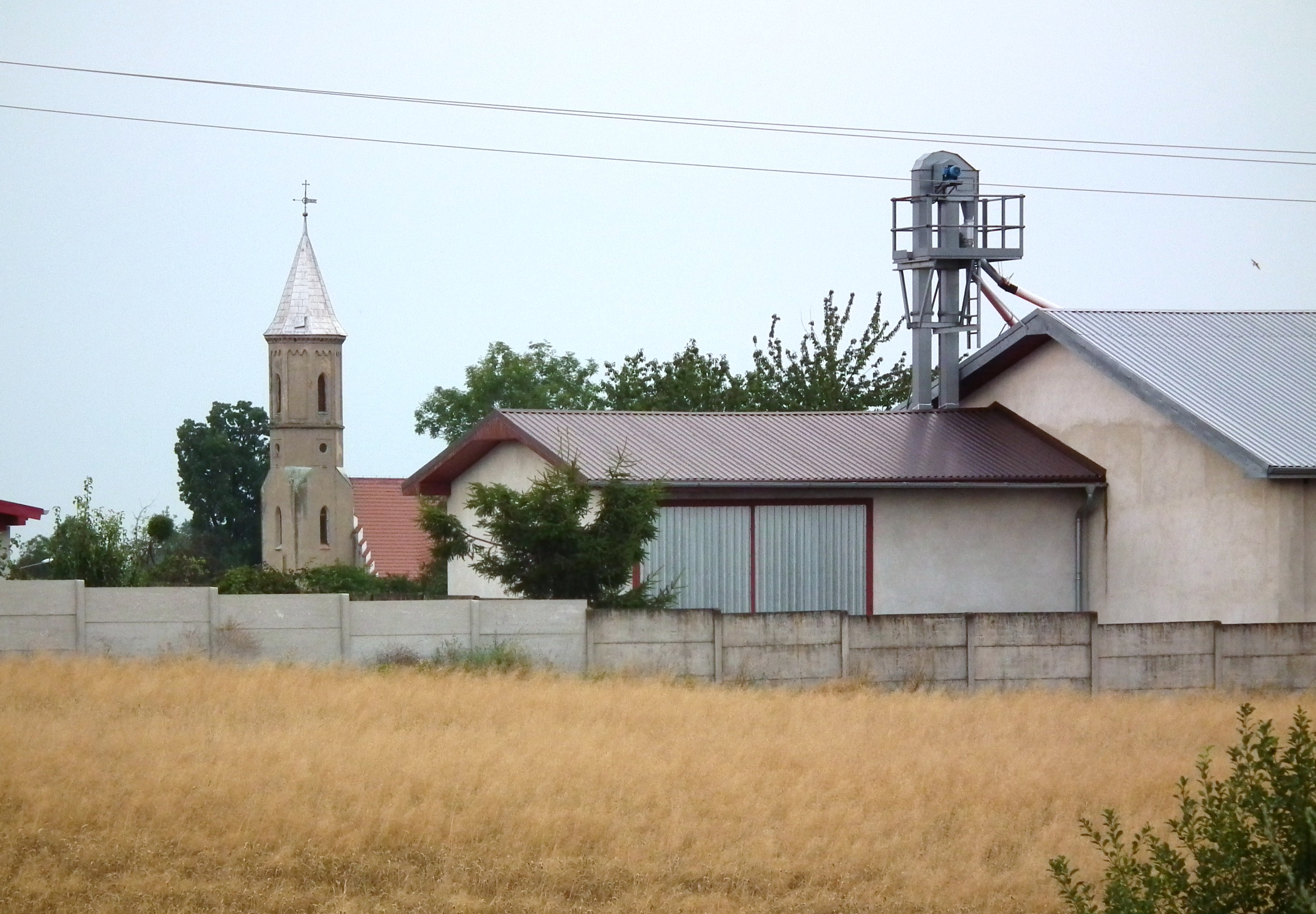

- Location within Poland
- Coordinates: 50°42′10″N 16°55′07″E
- Country: Poland
- Voivodeship: Lower Silesian
- County: Ząbkowice
- Gmina: Ciepłowody

Dobrzenice [dɔbʐɛˈnit͡sɛ] is a village in the administrative district of Gmina Ciepłowody, within Ząbkowice County, Lower Silesian Voivodeship, in south-western Poland.
