= Vilémov =

Vilémov may refer to places in the Czech Republic:

- Vilémov (Chomutov District), a municipality and village in the Ústí nad Labem Region
- Vilémov (Děčín District), a municipality and village in the Ústí nad Labem Region
  - SK Stap Tratec Vilémov, an association football club
- Vilémov (Havlíčkův Brod District), a market town in the Vysočina Region
- Vilémov (Olomouc District), a municipality and village in the Olomouc Region
- Vilémov, a village and part of Tachov in the Plzeň Region

== See also ==
- Vilémovice (disambiguation)
