= Wilamowice (disambiguation) =

Wilamowice is a town in Bielsko County, Silesian Voivodeship, in the south of Poland.

Wilamowice may also refer to the following places:

- Wilamowice, Cieszyn County in Silesian Voivodeship
- Wilamowice, Lower Silesian Voivodeship (south-west Poland)
- Wilamowice, Masovian Voivodeship (east-central Poland)
