= Cienkowice =

- Village
- Location within Poland
- Coordinates: 50°40′N 16°56′E
- Country: Poland
- Voivodeship: Lower Silesian
- County: Ząbkowice
- Gmina: Ciepłowody

Cienkowice [t͡ɕɛnkɔˈvit͡sɛ] is a village in the administrative district of Gmina Ciepłowody, within Ząbkowice County, Lower Silesian Voivodeship, in south-western Poland.
