= Tomice, Ząbkowice County =

Tomice
- Village
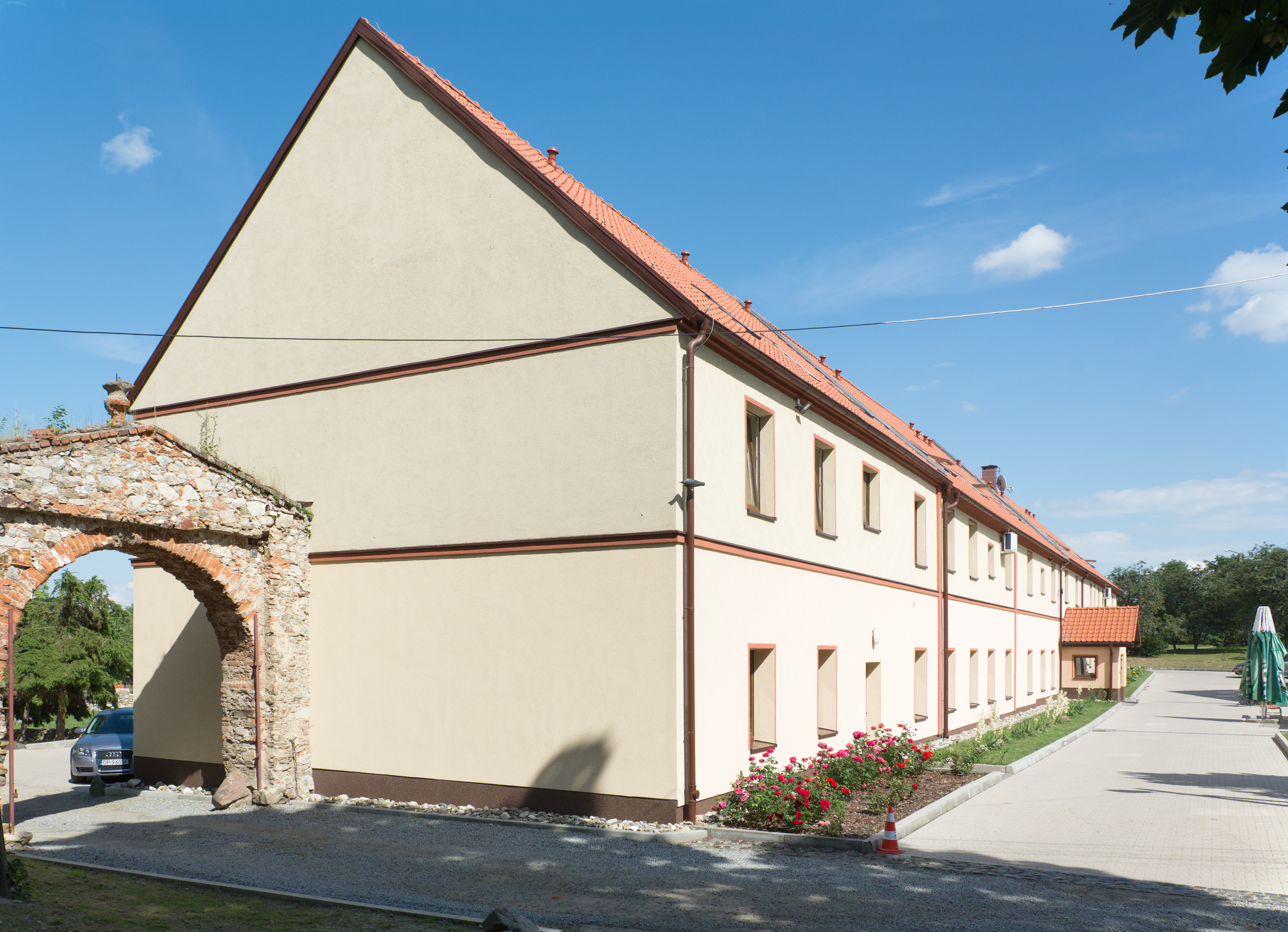

- Location within Poland
- Coordinates: 50°39′N 16°51′E
- Country: Poland
- Voivodeship: Lower Silesian
- County: Ząbkowice
- Gmina: Ciepłowody

Tomice [tɔˈmit͡sɛ] is a village in the administrative district of Gmina Ciepłowody, within Ząbkowice County, Lower Silesian Voivodeship, in south-western Poland.
