= Ludwig Luer =

German World War I flying ace

- Born: Unknown birth date
- Died: Unknown death date
- Military career
- Allegiance: German Empire
- Branch: Luftstreitkräfte
- Rank: Leutnant
- Unit: Jagdstaffel 27
- Commands: Jagdstaffel 62
- Awards: Iron Cross

Leutnant Ludwig Luer was a German World War I flying ace credited with six aerial victories.

== World War I service ==
Luer was transferred from Armee-Flug-Park 4 (Army Flight Park 4) to Jagdstaffel 27, a fighter squadron, on 7 March 1917. At that time, he was ranked as an Offizierstellvertreter (Deputy Officer). By August 1917, he had been commissioned as a Leutnant. On 14 August, he shot down an observation balloon west of Ypres at 1637 hours; that same day, he received the Iron Cross First Class.

On 9 September 1917, Luer shot down a 70 Squadron Sopwith Camel (serial number B3916) over Frezenberg. At 1010 hours on 24 October, he downed a SPAD from Naval Ten northeast of Zonnebeke. His fourth victory came on 5 November 1917, when he destroyed another Camel.

On 5 January 1918, Luer left Jasta 27 to become the first Staffelführer (Commanding Officer) of Jagdstaffel 62. He would score his fifth victory with them on the evening of 22 April, when he scored another SPAD over Mezieres. He would tally one more victory on 16 May 1918, over a SPAD over Montdidier. On 22 May, he went to hospital until 1 July. On 8 July 1918, he was relieved from combat duty.
