= Gmina Ciepłowody =

Gmina Ciepłowody Ciepłowody Commune
- Gmina
- Coat of arms
- Interactive map of Gmina Ciepłowody
- Coordinates (Ciepłowody): 50°40′N 16°54′E
- Country: Poland
- Voivodeship: Lower Silesian
- County: Ząbkowice
- Seat: Ciepłowody
- Sołectwos: Baldwinowice, Brochocin, Cienkowice, Ciepłowody, Czesławice, Dobrzenice, Jakubów, Janówka, Karczowice, Kobyla Głowa, Muszkowice, Piotrowice Polskie, Stary Henryków, Targowica, Tomice, Wilamowice

Area
  - Total: 77.53 km^{2} (29.93 sq mi)

Population (2019-06-30)
  - Total: 3,016
  - Density: 38.90/km^{2} (100.8/sq mi)
- Website: www.cieplowody.pl

Gmina Ciepłowody is a rural gmina (administrative district) in Ząbkowice County, Lower Silesian Voivodeship, in south-western Poland. Its seat is the village of Ciepłowody, which lies approximately 11 kilometres (7 mi) north-east of Ząbkowice Śląskie, and 52 kilometres (32 mi) south of the regional capital Wrocław.

The gmina covers an area of 77.53 square kilometres (29.9 sq mi), and as of 2019 its total population is 3,016.

== Neighbouring gminas ==
Gmina Ciepłowody is bordered by the gminas of Kondratowice, Niemcza, Strzelin, Ząbkowice Śląskie and Ziębice.

== Villages ==
The gmina contains the villages of Baldwinowice, Brochocin, Cienkowice, Ciepłowody, Czesławice, Dobrzenice, Jakubów, Janówka, Karczowice, Kobyla Głowa, Muszkowice, Piotrowice Polskie, Stary Henryków, Targowica, Tomice and Wilamowice.
