= Kobyla Głowa =

- Village
- Location within Poland
- Coordinates: 50°39′16″N 16°52′33″E
- Country: Poland
- Voivodeship: Lower Silesian
- County: Ząbkowice
- Gmina: Ciepłowody

Kobyla Głowa (Polish pronunciation: [kɔˈbɨla ˈɡwɔva]) is a village in the administrative district of Gmina Ciepłowody, within Ząbkowice County, Lower Silesian Voivodeship, in south-western Poland.
