= Czesławice, Lower Silesian Voivodeship =

Czesławice
- Village
- Location within Poland
- Coordinates: 50°39′04″N 16°59′05″E
- Country: Poland
- Voivodeship: Lower Silesian
- County: Ząbkowice
- Gmina: Ciepłowody

Czesławice (Polish: [t͡ʂɛswaˈvit͡sɛ]) is a village in the administrative district of Gmina Ciepłowody, within Ząbkowice County, Lower Silesian Voivodeship, in south-western Poland.

== Climate ==
This area has few extremes of temperature and ample precipitation in all months. The Köppen Climate Classification subtype for this climate is "Cfb". (Marine West Coast Climate).

Climate data for Czesławice
Month	Jan	Feb	Mar	Apr	May	Jun	Jul	Aug	Sep	Oct	Nov	Dec	Year
Record high °C (°F)	19.7 (67.5)	20.1 (68.2)	25.4 (77.7)	32.0 (89.6)	33.9 (93.0)	38.0 (100.4)	39.0 (102.2)	37.7 (99.9)	34.9 (94.8)	28.1 (82.6)	20.9 (69.6)	17.7 (63.9)	39.0 (102.2)
Mean daily maximum °C (°F)	3.0 (37.4)	4.3 (39.7)	9.0 (48.2)	14.5 (58.1)	20.0 (68.0)	22.8 (73.0)	26.1 (79.0)	26.3 (79.3)	20.9 (69.6)	14.4 (57.9)	7.7 (45.9)	3.9 (39.0)	14.0 (57.2)
Daily mean °C (°F)	−0.5 (31.1)	0.4 (32.7)	4.2 (39.6)	9.9 (49.8)	14.9 (58.8)	18.2 (64.8)	19.9 (67.8)	19.5 (67.1)	15.2 (59.4)	10.0 (50.0)	4.7 (40.5)	0.9 (33.6)	9.8 (49.6)
Mean daily minimum °C (°F)	−3.7 (25.3)	−2.8 (27.0)	0.2 (32.4)	5.2 (41.4)	10.0 (50.0)	14.4 (57.9)	15.3 (59.5)	15.2 (59.4)	11.2 (52.2)	5.9 (42.6)	2.3 (36.1)	−2 (28)	5.9 (42.6)
Record low °C (°F)	−30 (−22)	−29.4 (−20.9)	−22.1 (−7.8)	−6.3 (20.7)	−3.1 (26.4)	1.1 (34.0)	4.7 (40.5)	2.9 (37.2)	−2 (28)	−6 (21)	−15.4 (4.3)	−22.7 (−8.9)	−30 (−22)
Average precipitation mm (inches)	34 (1.3)	32 (1.3)	39 (1.5)	38 (1.5)	54 (2.1)	69 (2.7)	75 (3.0)	65 (2.6)	43 (1.7)	38 (1.5)	41 (1.6)	38 (1.5)	566 (22.3)
Average precipitation days	14	12	12	10	13	12	14	13	11	13	15	12	151
Average relative humidity (%)	81	84	76	69	66	70	71	71	75	78	83	85	76
Mean monthly sunshine hours	59	68	117	169	221	225	223	217	151	118	54	44	1,670
