= Piotrowice Polskie =

- Village
- Location within Poland
- Coordinates: 50°38′N 16°54′E
- Country: Poland
- Voivodeship: Lower Silesian
- County: Ząbkowice
- Gmina: Ciepłowody

Piotrowice Polskie [pjɔtrɔˈvit͡sɛ ˈpɔlskʲɛ] is a village in the administrative district of Gmina Ciepłowody, within Ząbkowice County, Lower Silesian Voivodeship, in south-western Poland.
