= Muszkowice =

- Village
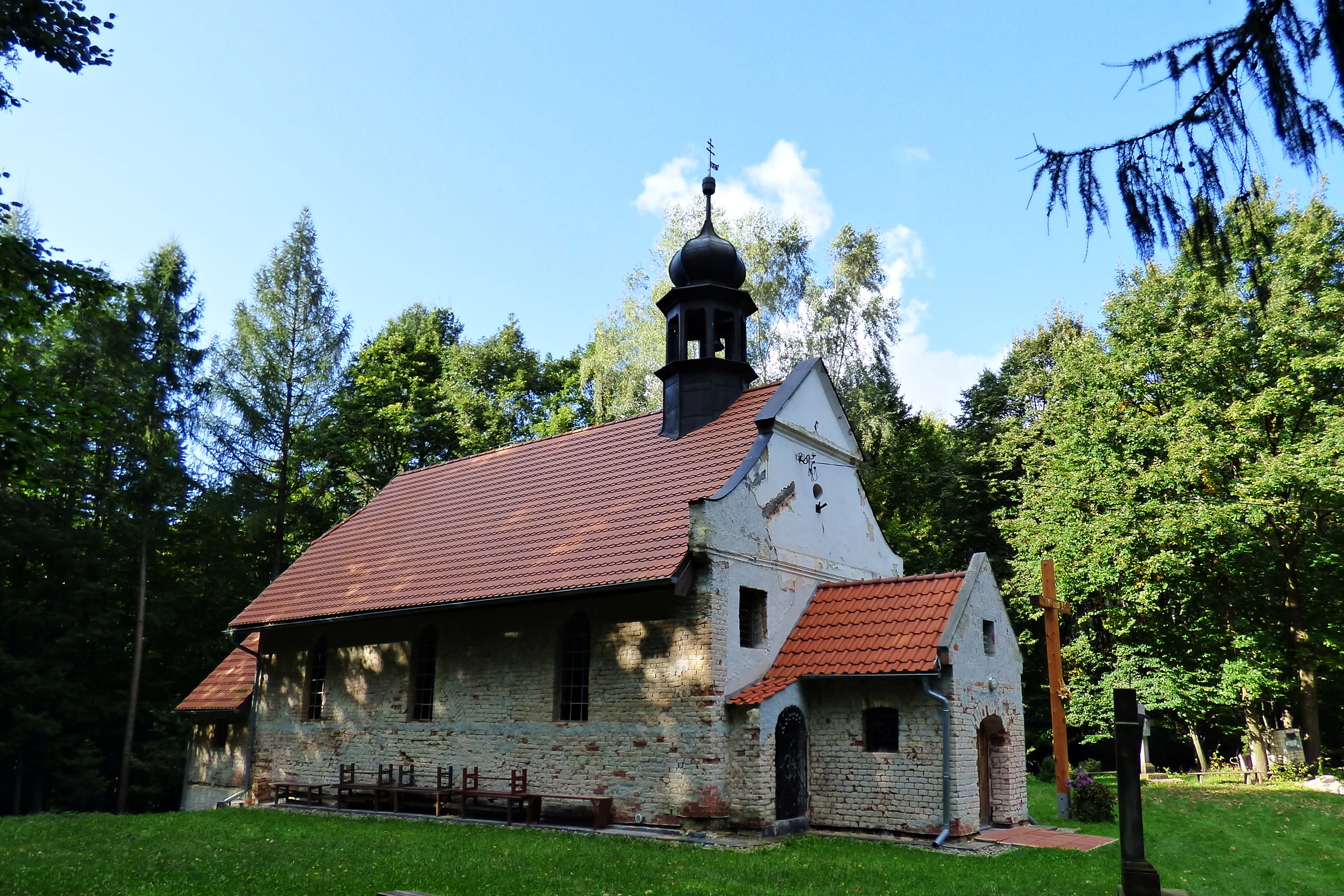
- Chapel

- Location within Poland
- Coordinates: 50°39′N 16°58′E
- Country: Poland
- Voivodeship: Lower Silesian
- County: Ząbkowice
- Gmina: Ciepłowody

Muszkowice [muʂkɔˈvit͡sɛ] is a village in the administrative district of Gmina Ciepłowody, within Ząbkowice County, Lower Silesian Voivodeship, in south-western Poland.
