= Jakubów, Ząbkowice County =

Jakubów
- Village
- Location within Poland
- Coordinates: 50°41′54″N 16°55′39″E
- Country: Poland
- Voivodeship: Lower Silesian
- County: Ząbkowice
- Gmina: Ciepłowody
- Time zone: UTC+1 (CET)
  - Summer (DST): UTC+2 (CEST)
- Vehicle registration: DZA

Jakubów [jaˈkubuf] is a village in the administrative district of Gmina Ciepłowody, within Ząbkowice County, Lower Silesian Voivodeship, in south-western Poland.
