= Janówka, Lower Silesian Voivodeship =

Janówka
- Village
- Location within Poland
- Coordinates: 50°41′22″N 16°56′54″E

Janówka [jaˈnufka] is a village in the administrative district of Gmina Ciepłowody, within Ząbkowice County, Lower Silesian Voivodeship, in south-western Poland.
