= Jagdstaffel 62 =

Jasta 62
- Active: 1918
- Country: Kingdom of Prussia, German Empire
- Branch: Luftstreitkräfte
- Type: Fighter squadron
- Engagements: World War I

Royal Prussian Jagdstaffel 62, commonly abbreviated to Jasta 62, was a "hunting group" (i.e., fighter squadron) of the Luftstreitkräfte, the air arm of the Imperial German Army during World War I. The squadron would score more than 42 aerial victories during the war, including 16 observation balloons downed. The unit's victories came at the expense of three pilots killed in action, two wounded in action, and two taken prisoner of war.

== History ==
Jasta 62 was founded on 16 January 1918 at the pilots and observers training school in Diest. It was attached to 1 Armee by 26 January 1918. On 1 March, the new squadron flew its first combat missions. It then transferred to 18 Armee on 16 March 1918. Jasta 62 drew its first blood on 31 March. On 5 July 1918, it returned to service with 1 Armee. It took up its final posting of the war with Armee-Abteilung C on 14 September 1918.

== Commanding officers (Staffelführer) ==
- Ludwig Luer: 16 January 1918 – 22 May 1918
- Leutnant Tonjes: 22 May 1918 – 6 July 1918
- Max Näther: 7 July 1918 – War's end

== Duty stations ==
- Thugny-Trugny, France: ca 26 January 1918
- Bohain-en-Vermandois, France: 16 March 1918 – 19 March 1918
- Balatre, France: 19 March 1918
- Saint-Rémy: 5 July 1918
- Preutin-Higny, France: 14 September 1918
