= Wilamowice, Lower Silesian Voivodeship =

Wilamowice
- Village
- Location within Poland
- Coordinates: 50°40′54″N 16°59′22″E
- Country: Poland
- Voivodeship: Lower Silesian
- County: Ząbkowice
- Gmina: Ciepłowody

Wilamowice [vilamɔˈvit͡sɛ] is a village in the administrative district of Gmina Ciepłowody, within Ząbkowice County, Lower Silesian Voivodeship, in south-western Poland.
