= Max Näther =

German World War I flying ace (1899–1919)

- Born: 24 August 1899; Tepliwoda, Silesia
- Died: 8 January 1919 (aged 19); Colmar, Province of Posen
- Military career
- Allegiance: German Empire
- Branch: Army, Air Service
- Service years: 1914–1919
- Rank: Leutnant
- Units: Fliegerersatz-Abteilung 7 (Replacement Detachment 7); Jagdstaffel 62 (Fighter Squadron 62)
- Commands: Jagdstaffel 62
- Awards: Royal House Order of Hohenzollern; Iron Cross

Leutnant Max Näther (24 August 1899 – 8 January 1919) HOH, IC, was a German World War I ace fighter pilot who destroyed 26 enemy aircraft. He shot down ten observation balloons and sixteen airplanes, including ten SPAD S.XIII fighters and a Sopwith Dolphin. He was killed in his plane at the border of Germany during the Greater Poland uprising on 8 January 1919.

== Early life and army service ==
Näther was born on 24 August 1899 in Tepliwoda, Silesia, in what was then the eastern part of the Kingdom of Prussia and is now Poland. He joined the German army in 1914, at age 15. He was wounded twice before being commissioned as Leutnant der Reserve on 11 August 1916, just before his 17th birthday. He won both the Second and First Class Iron Crosses during this time, the latter on 1 February 1916. In the summer of 1917, he volunteered for transfer to the Air Service.

== Aerial service ==
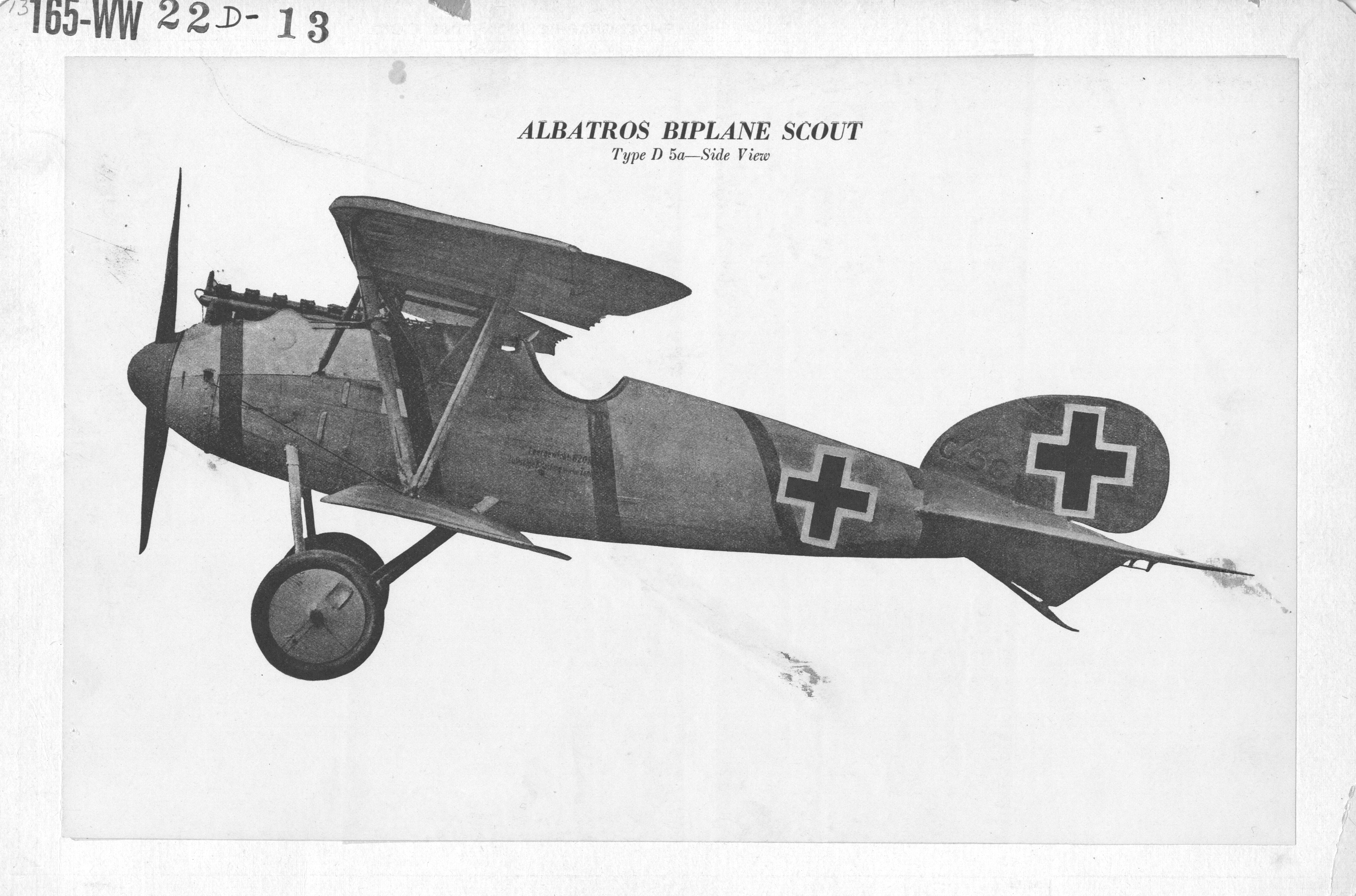
Näther's Albatros D.Va was black with a German flag painted on its side.

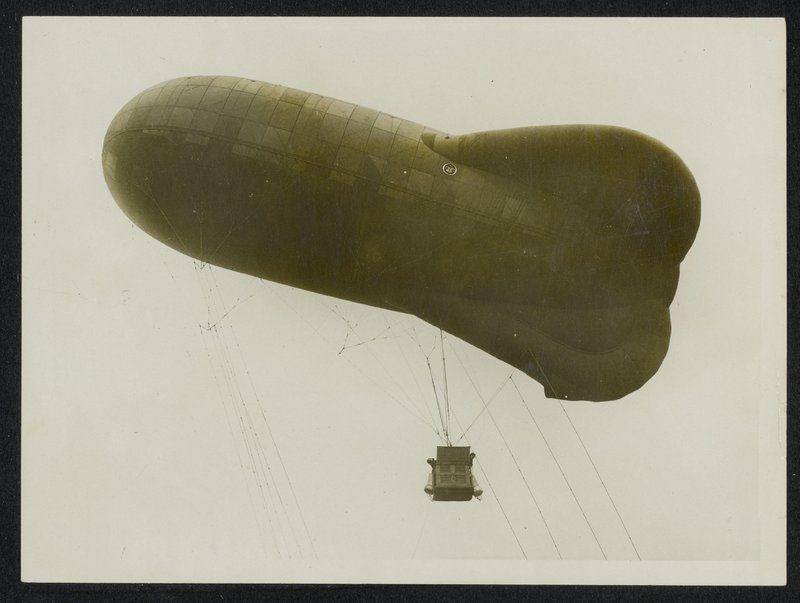
Observation balloons were very flammable, but well defended.

Näther took basic flight training in Bucharest. He then progressed to training with Fliegerersatz-Abteilung 7 (Replacement Detachment 7) at Brunswick. His final training was at Jastaschule I (Fighter Training School 1) in Valenciennes, France. He graduated from Jastaschule I and was assigned to Jagdstaffel 62 (Fighter Squadron 62) on 31 March 1918. He flew an all black Albatros D.Va with a personal insignia of a German national flag streaming from a slanted staff imposed on a white square painted on the side of the plane's fuselage just aft of the cockpit.

Näther made his first aerial kill on 16 May 1918, over a Spad XIII. Then, in June, he reeled off a string of six more over enemy observation balloons between the 1st and the 28th, becoming an ace on the 16th. Balloons were well defended by surrounding anti-aircraft and nearby patrols of fighter planes, and attacks on them were considered near suicidal. He became Staffelführer (Commander) on 7 July 1918, just before his 19th birthday. Näther took leave from 28 July to 21 August; he probably waited to change planes to a Fokker D.VII until after his return.

In September, he was awarded the Knight's Cross with Swords of the Royal House Order of Hohenzollern. He shot down another six that month, including two more balloons. On 26 September, he downed a Spad S.XIII in the morning and a balloon and another Spad S.XIII in the afternoon. He was slightly wounded the following day. He began October with back-to-back kills on the 9th and 10th. After another on the 18th, he incinerated his tenth and final balloon on the 23rd. As he returned from this mission, Näther was shot down by Jacques Swaab, but survived a fiery crash-landing. His final three kills were scored on 29 October. Coincidentally, although he had become eligible with his 20th and 21st on 10 October, he was nominated for the Pour le Mérite on 29 October. His was one of several nominations that was not approved because of the war's end.

Näther's 26 kills comprised over half those of his entire squadron. These included ten observation balloons and eleven fighters—ten SPAD S.XIIIs and a Sopwith Dolphin.

== Death in Greater Poland uprising ==
Näther was killed on 8 January 1919 during the Greater Poland uprising after World War I, by Polish ground fire while flying over Colmar (now Chodziez) in the Province of Posen (now Poland).

== Notes ==
Military offices
Preceded by Erich Tönjes	Commanding Officer of Jasta 62; 7 July 1918 – 11 November 1918 or after	Squadron disbanded
