= Ciepłowody =

- Village
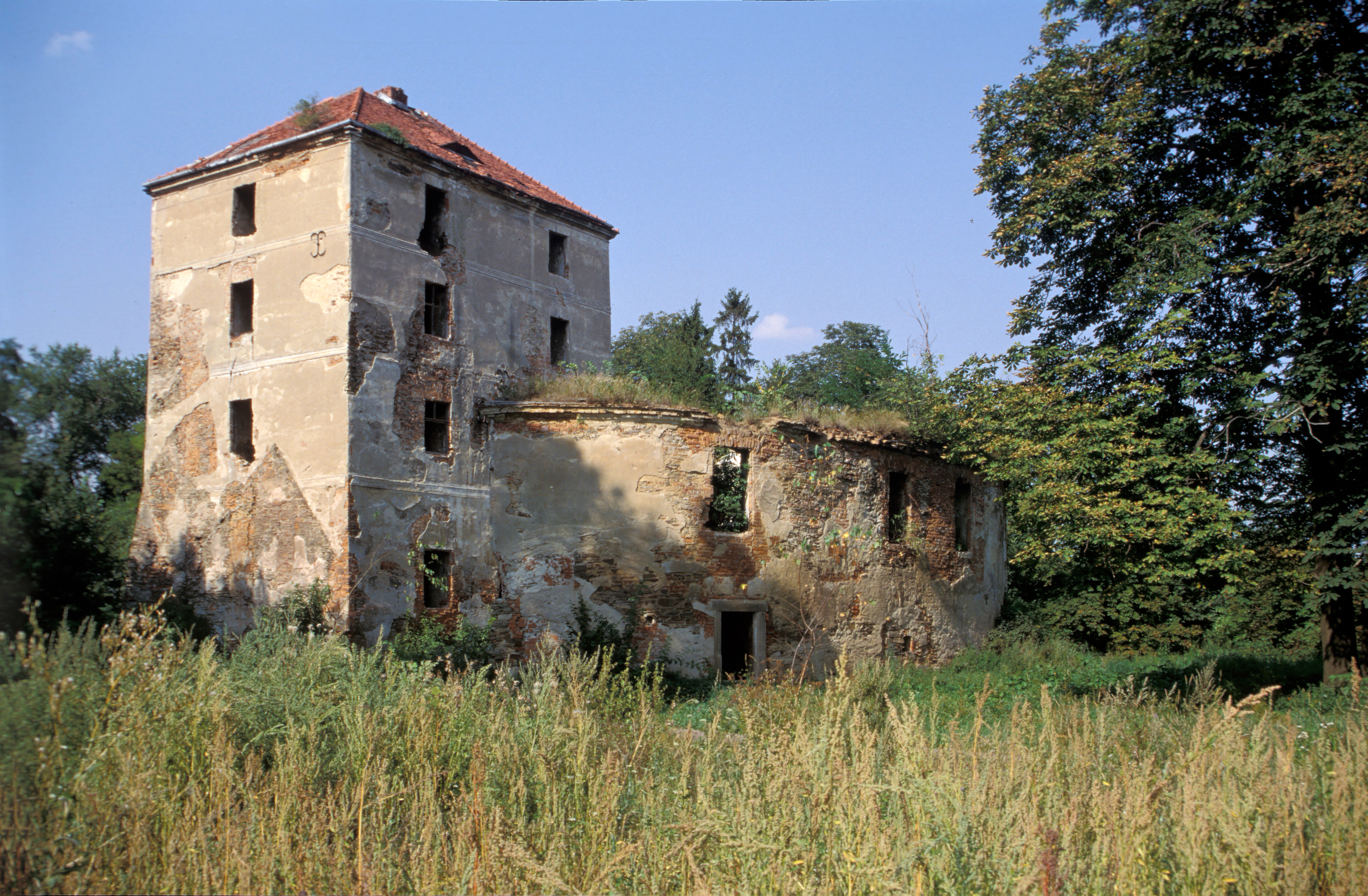
- Castle ruins

- Coat of arms

- Location within Poland
- Coordinates: 50°40′N 16°54′E
- Country: Poland
- Voivodeship: Lower Silesian
- County: Ząbkowice
- Gmina: Ciepłowody
- Population: 1,200

Ciepłowody ([t͡ɕɛpwɔˈvɔdɨ]) is a village in Ząbkowice County, Lower Silesian Voivodeship, in south-western Poland. It is the seat of the administrative district (gmina) called Gmina Ciepłowody.

== Notable residents ==
- Max Näther (1899–1919), World War I pilot
