= Brochocin, Ząbkowice County =

Brochocin
- Village
- Location within Poland
- Coordinates: 50°41′53″N 16°53′35″E
- Country: Poland
- Voivodeship: Lower Silesian
- County: Ząbkowice
- Gmina: Ciepłowody

Brochocin [brɔˈxɔt͡ɕin] is a village in the administrative district of Gmina Ciepłowody, within Ząbkowice County, Lower Silesian Voivodeship, in south-western Poland.

== Notable people ==
- Friedrich von Logau (1605 in Brockut – 1655 in Liegnitz) was a German poet and epigrammatist of the Baroque era
