= Paul Hensel (politician) =

German politician

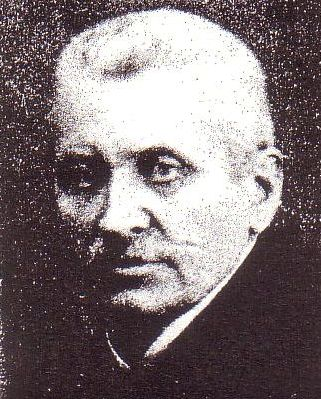

Prussian Landtag
- In office 1913–1918
- Constituency: Allenstein 3

Reichstag
- In office 1921–1928
- Constituency: Allenstein 3

Personal details
- Born: 3 October 1867 Gehsen, East Prussia, Prussia
- Died: 8 January 1944 (aged 76) Kolberg, Pomerania, Prussia
- Party: Conservatives; DNVP
- Occupation: Theologian

Paul Hensel (3 October 1867 – 8 January 1944) was a German Lutheran theologian and politician.

== Biography ==
Hensel was born in Gehsen (today Jeże, Poland) and visited school in Lyck. In 1886, he began to study Theology at the University of Königsberg and the University of Berlin and was a member of the Burschenschaft Corps Masovia. He started to work as a Lutheran Pastor at Gehsen and Friedrichshof in Masuria, later also at the Lutheran congregation of San Remo and became the Superintendent of Johannisburg. Hensel also published several publications in masurian language.

Since 1891 he was engaged in several organisations of agricultural cooperatives and became a member of the supervisory board of the "Landwirtschaftliche Zentraldarlehenskasse für Deutschland" in Berlin in 1920–24.

In 1913 Hensel was elected for the Conservative Party as the deputy of the constituency Allenstein 3 (Oletzko/Lyck/Johannisburg) at the Prussian Landtag until 1918 and in 1921–28 Hensel, now a member of the DNVP, was the deputy of the Allenstein 3 constituency at the Reichstag.

=== East Prussian plebiscite ===
After World War I according to the Treaty of Versailles a plebiscite in East Prussia was organised by the League of Nations to determine whether Masuria should remain as part of Weimar German East Prussia or belong to Second Polish Republic. Hensel soon started to support the German side and, as Superintendent of the old-Prussian Johannisburg deanery, travelled to Versailles already in March 1919 to hand over a collection of 144.447 signatures to the Allied Powers to protest against the planned cession.

Hensel appealed to the foundation of the pro-German Masurenbund and the Arbeitsausschuß Allenstein gegen die Polengefahr, which both joined the Masuren- und Ermländerbund in July 1919 under the presidency of Max Worgitzki. Hensel was active in the Ostdeutscher Heimatdienst and the head of the Committee of Lutheran parishes in Masuria.

The plebiscite turned out a majority of over 97% to remain in East Prussia.

Hensel died in Kolberg in 1944.

== Publications ==
- Die evangelischen Masuren in ihrer kirchlichen und nationalen Eigenart, Königsberg 1908
- Die Polengefahr für die masurische Bevölkerung, Berlin 1911
- Kalendarz Królewsko-Pruski Ewangelicki, Johannisburg
