= Baldwinowice, Lower Silesian Voivodeship =

Baldwinowice
- Village
- Location within Poland
- Coordinates: 50°38′08″N 16°53′39″E
- Country: Poland
- Voivodeship: Lower Silesian
- County: Ząbkowice
- Gmina: Ciepłowody

Baldwinowice [baldvinɔˈvit͡sɛ] is a village in the administrative district of Gmina Ciepłowody, within Ząbkowice County, Lower Silesian Voivodeship, in south-western Poland.
