= Targowica, Lower Silesian Voivodeship =

Targowica
- Village
- Location within Poland
- Coordinates: 50°41′N 16°58′E
- Country: Poland
- Voivodeship: Lower Silesian
- County: Ząbkowice
- Gmina: Ciepłowody
- Time zone: UTC+1 (CET)
  - Summer (DST): UTC+2 (CEST)
- Vehicle registration: DZA

Targowica [tarɡɔˈvit͡sa] is a village in the administrative district of Gmina Ciepłowody, within Ząbkowice County, Lower Silesian Voivodeship, in south-western Poland.
