= Friedrich von Logau =

German poet and epigrammatist

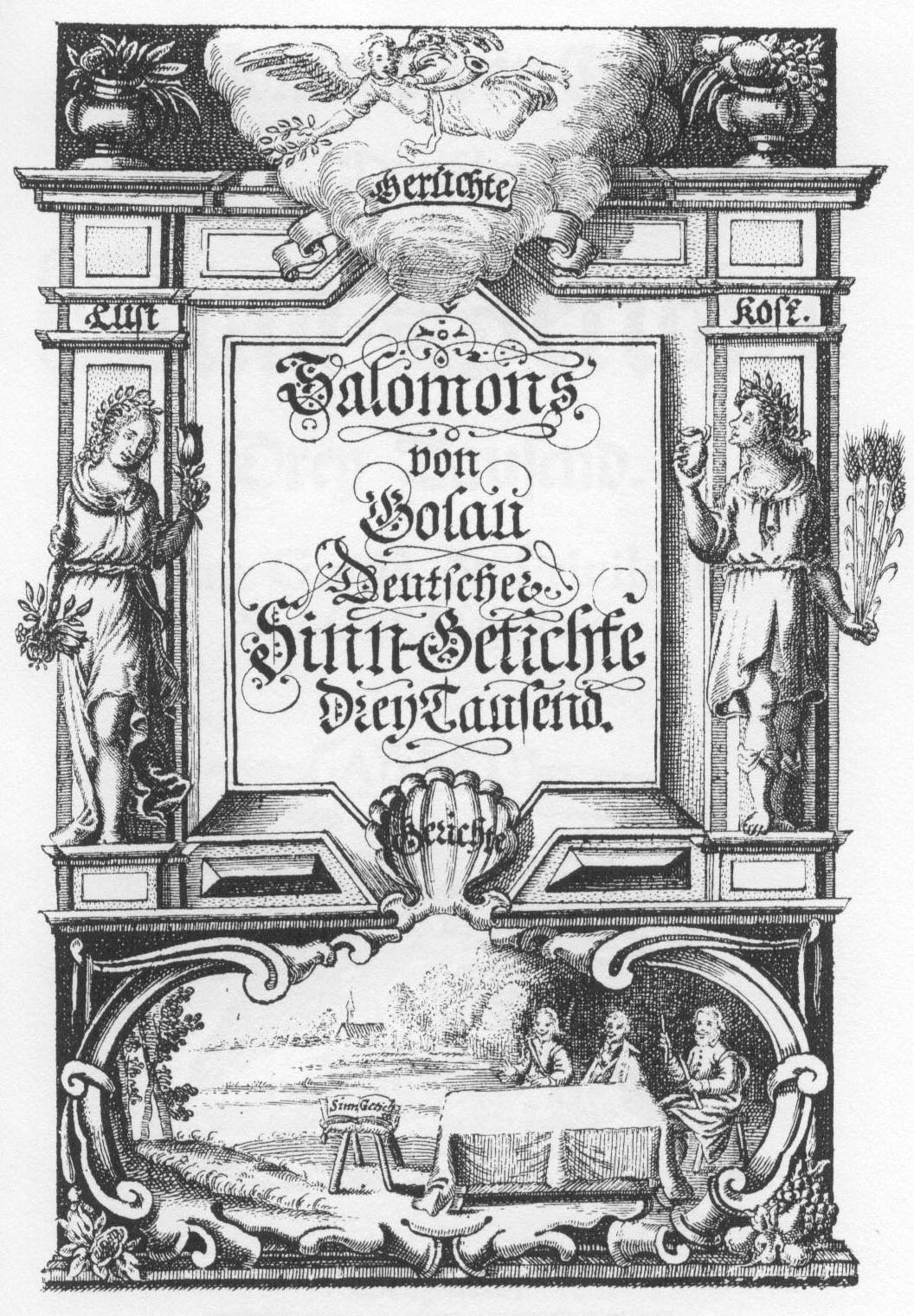
Sinngedichte, copperplate title print, 1654

Friedrich von Logau (January 1605 – 24 July 1655) was a German poet and epigrammatist of the Baroque era.

== Life ==
He was born the son of Georg von Logau, estate owner in Brockut near Nimptsch in Silesia (present-day Niemcza, Poland). His father died in the year of his birth. From 1614 to 1625 Logau was educated at the renowned gymnasium school in Brieg, benefitted by Duke John Christian, and subsequently studied law at the University of Altdorf near Nuremberg.

Finishing his studies two years later, he administered his family estates from 1633, but had to flee to the ducal court in Brieg from approaching troops under Albrecht von Wallenstein shortly afterwards. As his family's estates were devastated, he finally entered the service of Duke Louis IV of Brieg as a low-paid ducal councillor in 1644. In July 1648 he was admitted to the Fruitbearing Society (Fruchtbringende Gesellschaft) under the name Der Verkleinernde (literally "the diminishing one") by Prince Louis I of Anhalt-Köthen. Logau regarded himself as a follower of Martin Opitz; but he did not allow such ties to influence his independence or originality. In 1653 he followed Duke Louis IV to the court of Liegnitz.

Logau was married twice; his beloved first wife died in 1640; the second marriage remained unhappy. He died at the age of 50 in Liegnitz, where he is buried in the St John parish church. His son Balthasar Friedrich was elevated to the noble rank of a Freiherr (baron) in 1687.

== Works ==
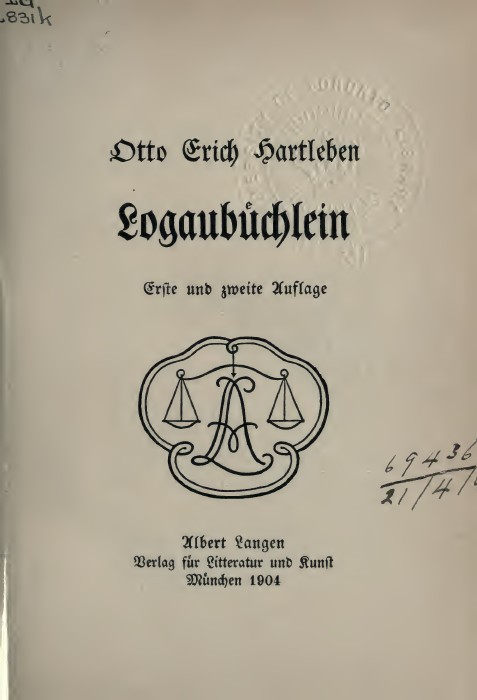
Logaubüchlein, 1904

Logau's epigrams show a range and variety of expression. They appeared in two collections under the pseudonym Salomon von Golaw (an anagram of his real name, referring to Gohlau and the Proverbs of Solomon) in 1638 (Erstes Hundert Teutscher Reimensprũche) and 1654 (Deutscher Sinngedichte drei Tausend). He had suffered under the adverse conditions of the time; but his satire is not merely the outcome of personal feeling. In the turbulent age of the Thirty Years' War he was one of the few men who preserved intact his intellectual integrity and judged his contemporaries fairly. He satirized with unsparing hand the court life, the useless bloodshed of the war, the lack of national pride in the German people, and their slavish imitation of the French in customs, dress and speech.

Logau's Sinngedichte were rediscovered and edited in 1759 by Gotthold Ephraim Lessing and Karl Wilhelm Ramler, who first drew attention to their merits; a second edition appeared in 1791. The composer Joseph Haydn set several of his verses in his canons, or a capella songs (Hob. XXVIIb). A critical edition was published in 1872 by G. Eitner, who also edited a selection of Logau's epigrams for the Deutsche Dichter des XVII. Jahrhunderts (vol. iii, 1870); there is also a selection by F.L. Oesterley in Kũrschners Deutsche Nationalliteratur, vol. xxviii. (1885). See H. Denker, Beitrage zur literarischen Würdigung Logaus (1889); W. Heuschkel, Untersuchungen über Ramlers and Lessings Bearbeitung Logauscher Sinngedichte (1901).

== Works ==
- Logau, Friedrich von (1870). Sinngedichte (in German). Brockhaus, Friedrich Arnold.
- Logau, Friedrich von (1904). Logaubüchlein (in German). Langen.
