= Jeże, Warmian-Masurian Voivodeship =

Jeże
- Village
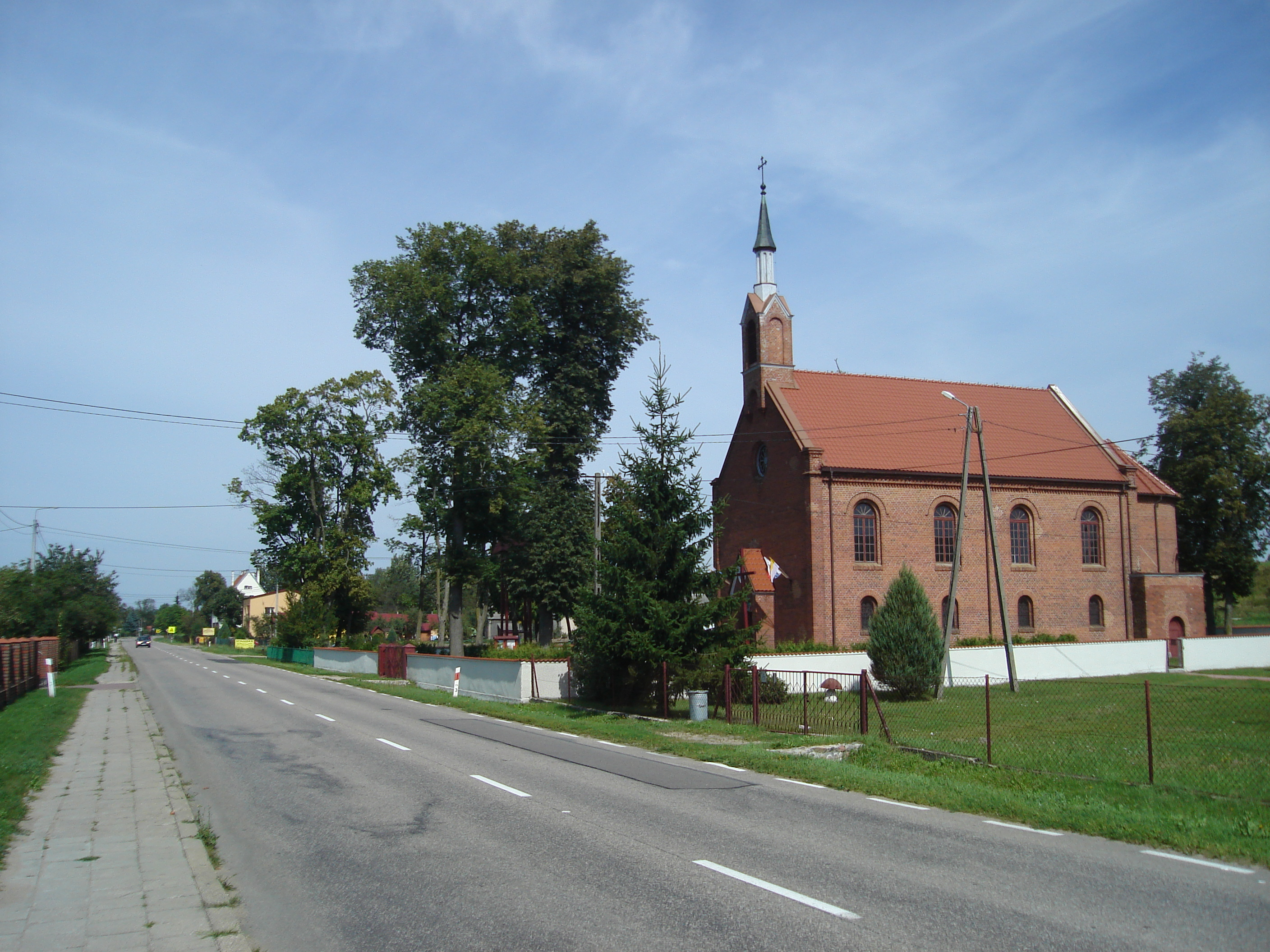

- Location within Poland
- Coordinates: 53°29′N 21°52′E
- Country: Poland
- Voivodeship: Warmian-Masurian
- County: Pisz
- Gmina: Pisz
- Population: 330

Jeże [ˈjɛʐɛ] is a village in the administrative district of Gmina Pisz, within Pisz County, Warmian-Masurian Voivodeship, in northern Poland.

== Notable residents ==
- Paul Hensel (politician) (1867–1944), Lutheran pastor and politician
