= 1848 =

1848 in various calendars
- Gregorian calendar: 1848; MDCCCXLVIII
- Ab urbe condita: 2601
- Armenian calendar: 1297; ԹՎ ՌՄՂԷ
- Assyrian calendar: 6598
- Baháʼí calendar: 4–5
- Balinese saka calendar: 1769–1770
- Bengali calendar: 1254–1255
- Berber calendar: 2798
- British Regnal year: 11 Vict. 1 – 12 Vict. 1
- Buddhist calendar: 2392
- Burmese calendar: 1210
- Byzantine calendar: 7356–7357
- Chinese calendar: 丁未年 (Fire Goat); 4545 or 4338 — to — 戊申年 (Earth Monkey); 4546 or 4339
- Coptic calendar: 1564–1565
- Discordian calendar: 3014
- Ethiopian calendar: 1840–1841
- Hebrew calendar: 5608–5609
- Hindu calendars
- Vikram Samvat: 1904–1905
- Shaka Samvat: 1769–1770
- Kali Yuga: 4948–4949
- Holocene calendar: 11848
- Igbo calendar: 848–849
- Iranian calendar: 1226–1227
- Islamic calendar: 1264–1265
- Japanese calendar: Kōka 5 / Kaei 1 (嘉永元年)
- Javanese calendar: 1775–1777
- Julian calendar: Gregorian minus 12 days
- Korean calendar: 4181
- Minguo calendar: 64 before ROC 民前64年
- Nanakshahi calendar: 380
- Thai solar calendar: 2390–2391
- Tibetan calendar: མེ་མོ་ལུག་ལོ་ (female Fire-Sheep); 1974 or 1593 or 821 — to — ས་ཕོ་སྤྲེ་ལོ་ (male Earth-Monkey); 1975 or 1594 or 822

1848 (MDCCCXLVIII) was a leap year starting on Saturday of the Gregorian calendar and a leap year starting on Thursday of the Julian calendar, the 1848th year of the Common Era (CE) and Anno Domini (AD) designations, the 848th year of the 2nd millennium, the 48th year of the 19th century, and the 9th year of the 1840s decade. As of the start of 1848, the Gregorian calendar was 12 days ahead of the Julian calendar, which remained in localized use until 1923.

1848 is historically famous for the wave of revolutions, a series of widespread struggles for more liberal governments, which broke out from Brazil to Hungary; although most failed in their immediate aims, they significantly altered the political and philosophical landscape and had major ramifications throughout the rest of the century.

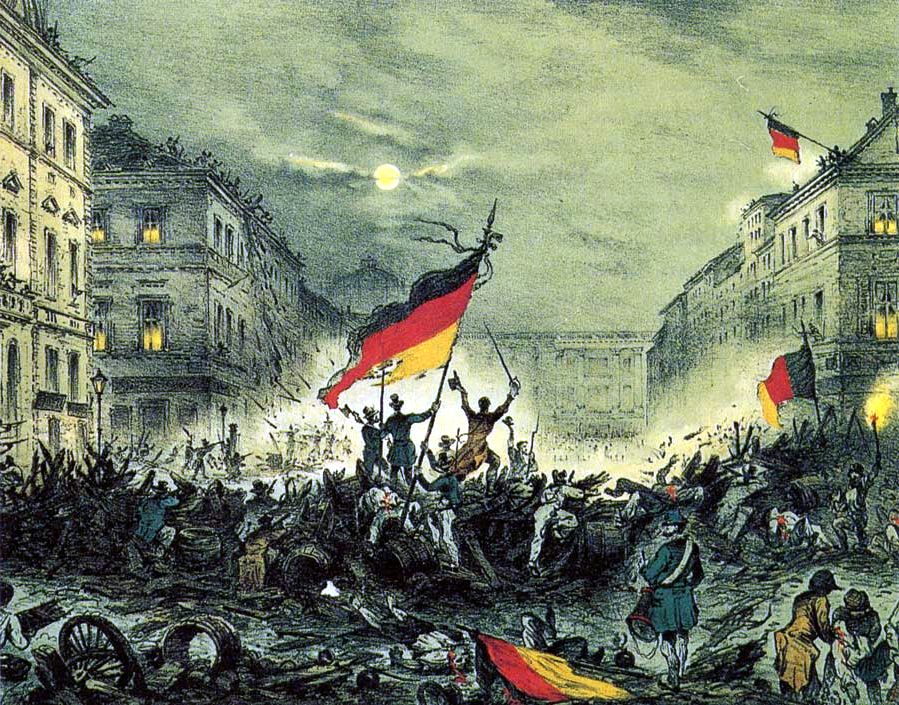
Cheering revolutionaries in Berlin, on March 19, 1848, with the new flag of Germany

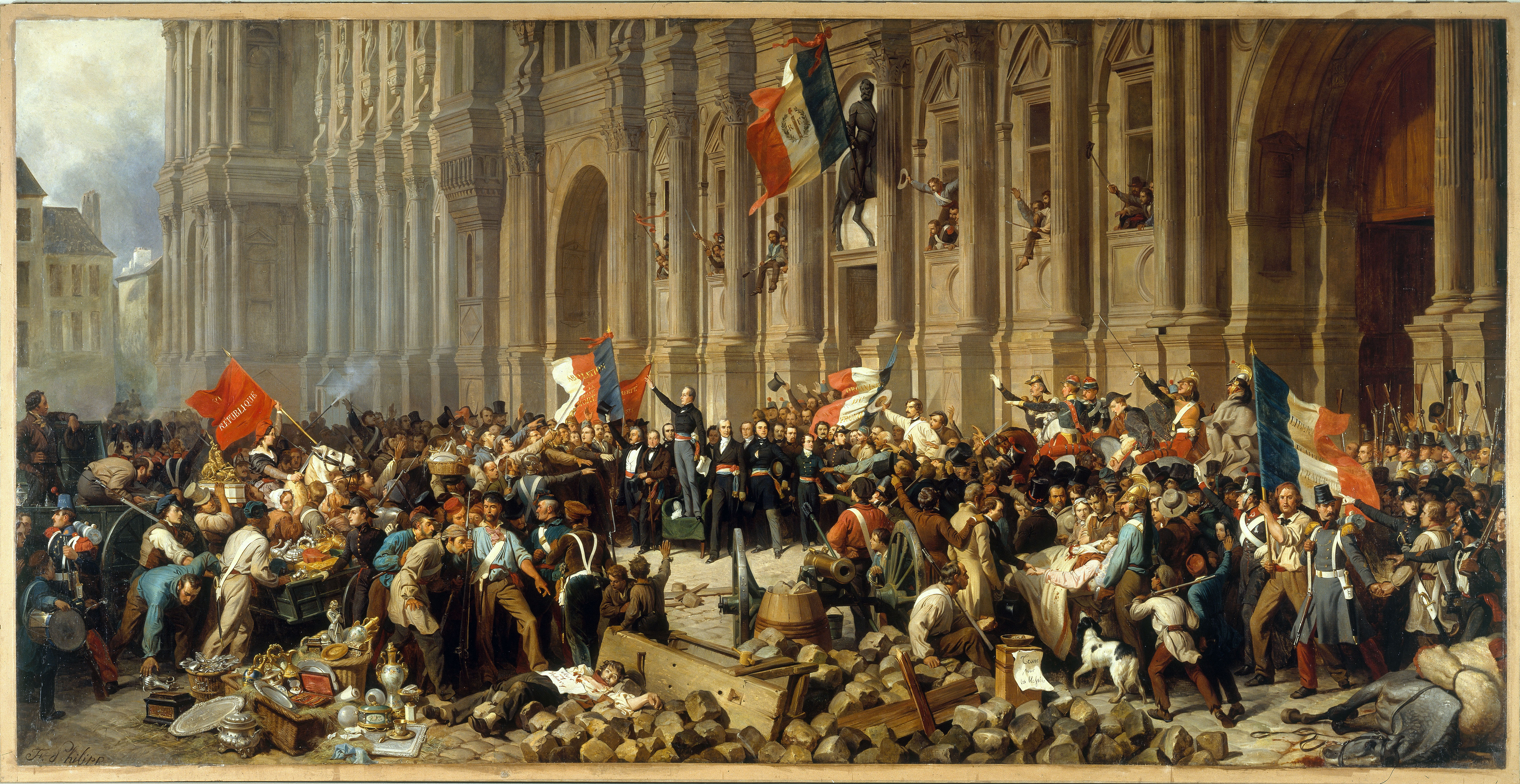
French Revolution of 1848: Republican riots force King Louis Philippe I to abdicate

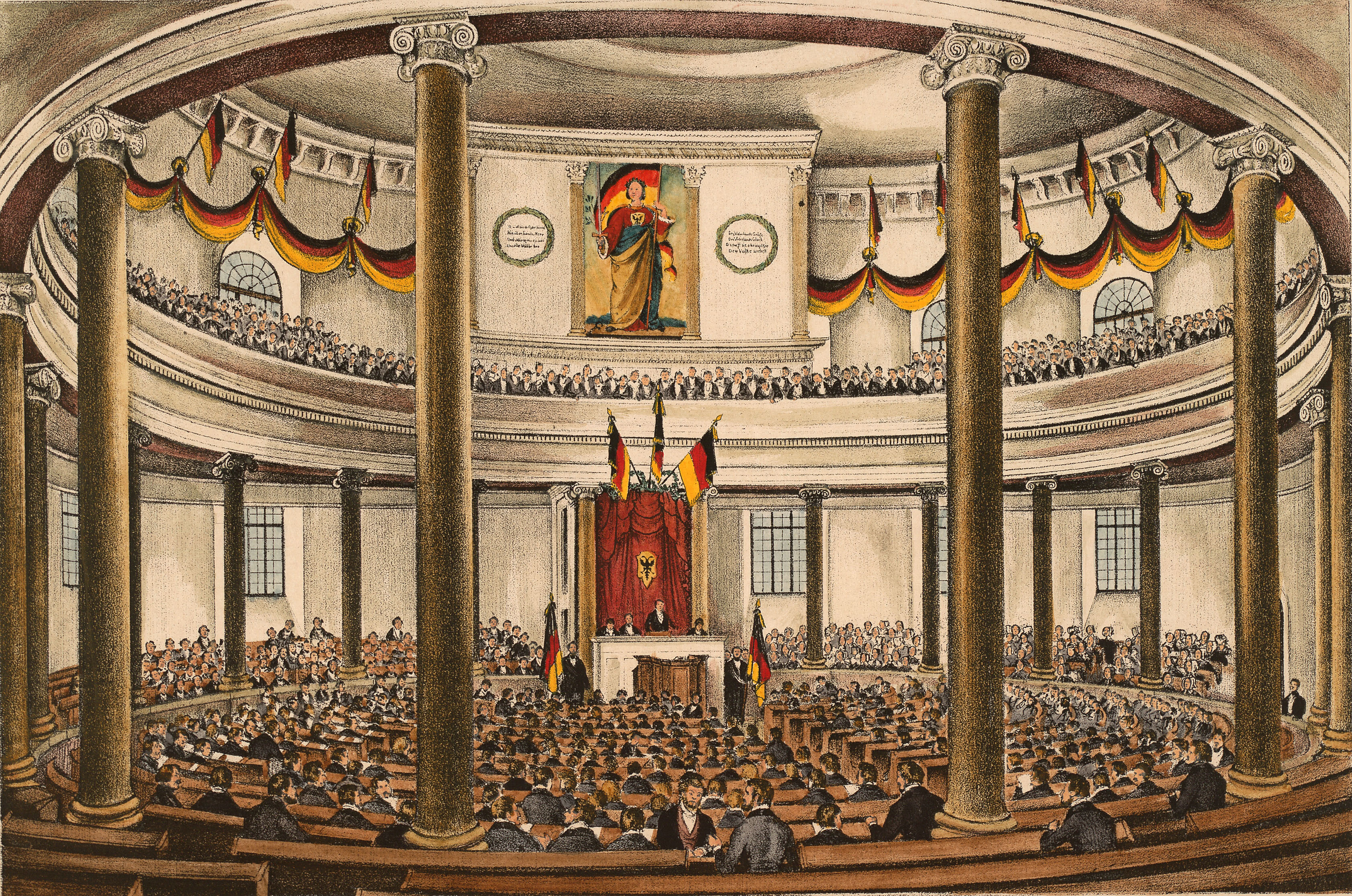
German National Assembly's meeting in St. Paul's Church

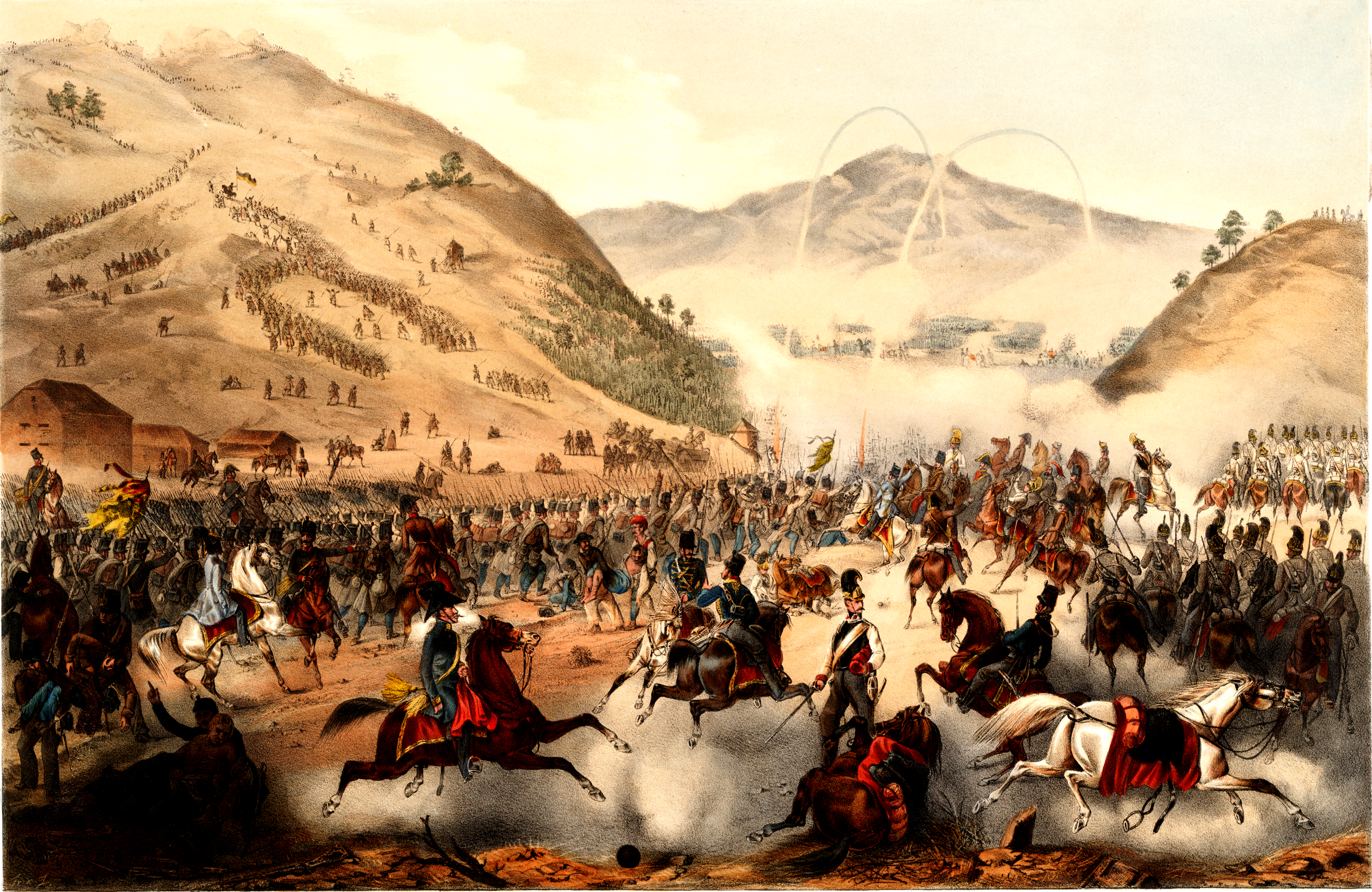
Battle of Pákozd in the Hungarian Revolution of 1848

== Events ==
February 2: The Treaty of Guadalupe Hidalgo is signed, ending the Mexican–American War and ceding all the Republic of Texas's territorial claims to the United States for $15m.

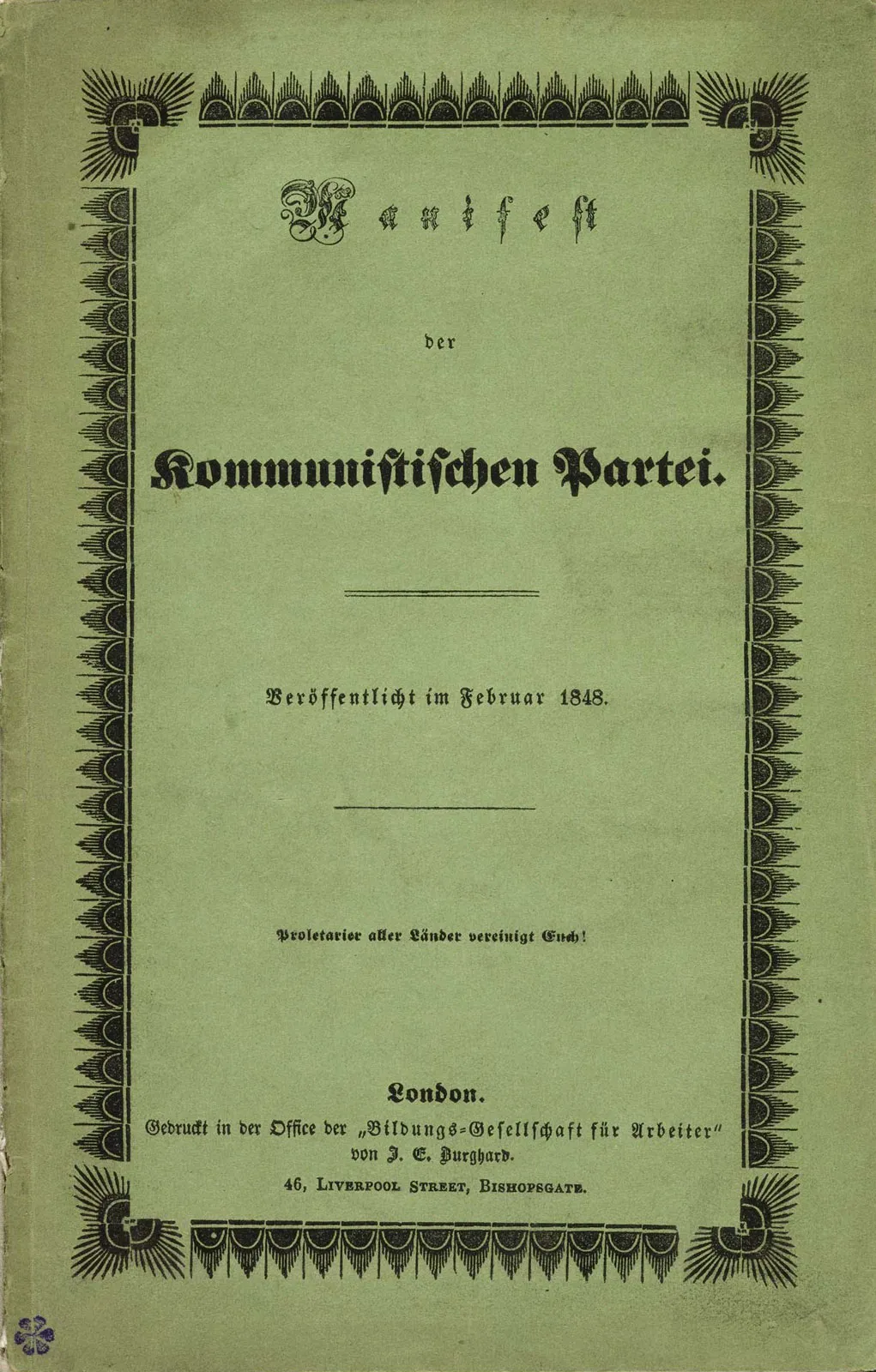
February 21: Karl Marx publishes The Communist Manifesto.

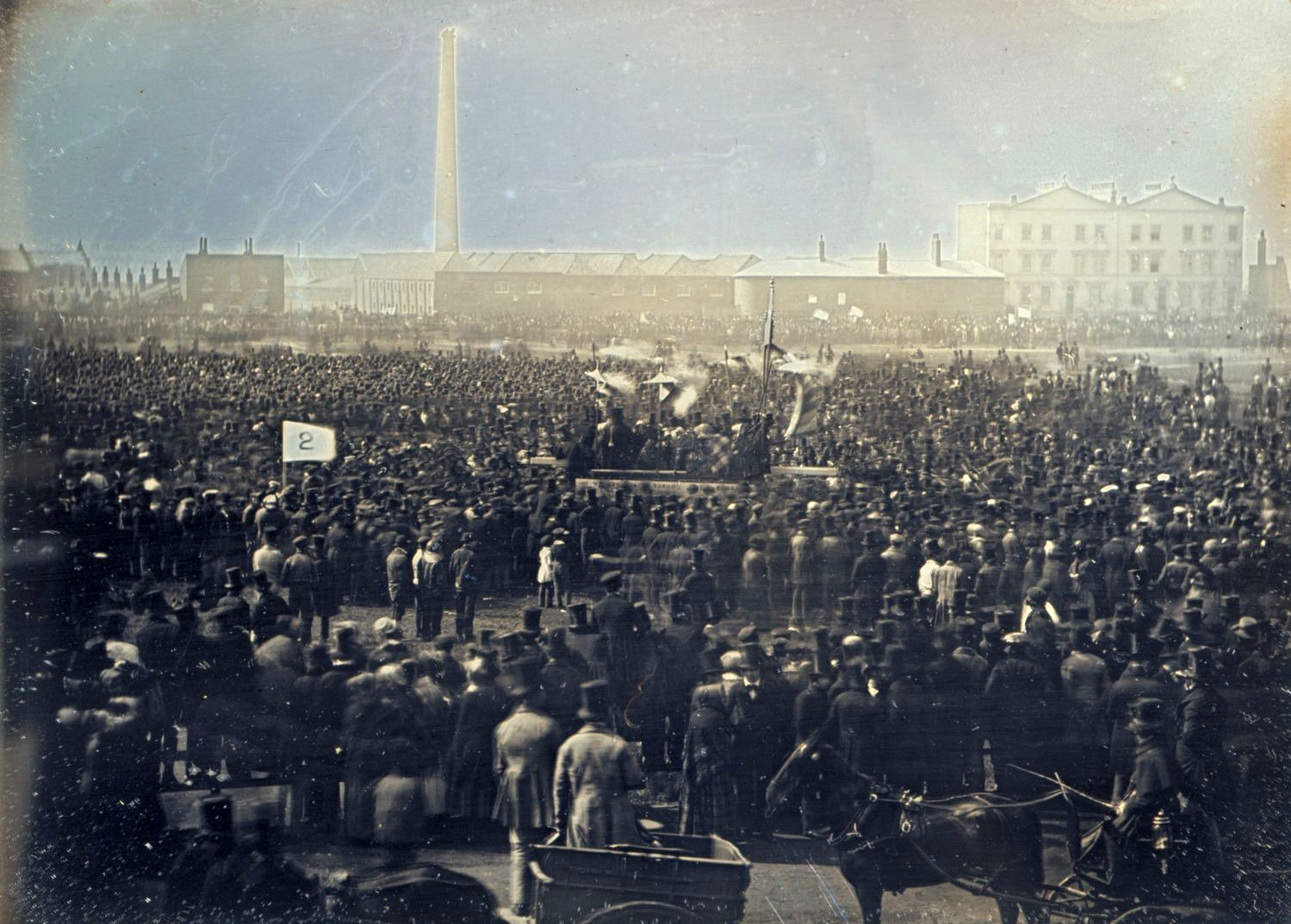
April 10: "Monster Rally" of Chartists held on Kennington Common in London; the first photograph of a crowd depicts it.

=== January–March ===
- January 3 – Joseph Jenkins Roberts is sworn in as the first president of the independent African Republic of Liberia.
- January 12 – Sicilian revolution of 1848: The Palermo rising erupts in Sicily against the Bourbon Kingdom of the Two Sicilies.
- January 24 – California Gold Rush: James W. Marshall finds gold at Sutter's Mill, in Coloma, California.
- January 31 – In the United States:
  - Construction of the Washington Monument begins in Washington, D.C.
  - John C. Frémont is court-martialed on grounds of mutiny and disobeying orders. The verdict is set aside by U.S. President James K. Polk, but Frémont retires to California Territory.
- February 2
  - Mexican–American War: Treaty of Guadalupe Hidalgo – Mexico cedes virtually all of what becomes the Southwestern United States to the U.S. The unincorporated California Territory becomes a provisional official possession; it is never organized by the United States Congress as a territory, but directly passes the requirements for statehood in 1850.
  - John Henry Newman founds the first Oratory in the English-speaking world, when he establishes the Birmingham Oratory at 'Maryvale', Old Oscott, England.
- February 17 – John Bird Sumner is nominated as Archbishop of Canterbury.
- February 21 – Karl Marx and Friedrich Engels publish The Communist Manifesto (Manifest der Kommunistischen Partei) in London.
- February 23 – French Revolution of 1848: François Guizot, Prime Minister of France, resigns; 52 people from the Paris mob are killed by soldiers guarding public buildings.
- February 24 – Louis Philippe I, King of the French, abdicates in favour of his grandson, Prince Philippe, Count of Paris (who is proclaimed as Louis Philippe II but not accepted by the people), and flees to England after days of revolution in Paris. The French Second Republic is later proclaimed by Alphonse de Lamartine, in the name of the provisional government elected by the Chamber, under the pressure of the mob.
- March 2 – The March Unrest breaks out in Sweden.
- March 4 – Carlo Alberto di Savoia signs the Statuto Albertino that will later represent the first constitution of the Regno d'Italia.
- March 7 – Comptoir national d'escompte de Paris, predecessor of European bank BNP Paribas, is founded by decree of the French Provisional Government.
- March 11 – Louis-Hippolyte Lafontaine and Robert Baldwin become the first Joint Premiers of the Province of Canada to be democratically elected under a system of responsible government.
- March 13 – Prince Klemens von Metternich gives up office as State Chancellor and Foreign Minister of the Austrian Empire.
- March 15 – Hungarian Revolution of 1848: The Hungarian young revolutionary intellectuals, led by Sándor Petőfi, Mór Jókai and others, called the Márciusi Ifjak (Young men of March) organize peaceful mass demonstrations in Pest, forcing the city's Habsburg authorities to accept the 12 Points: the Hungarian claim for freedom and self-determination within the Habsburg Empire. On the same day, Lajos Kossuth and representatives of the Diet of Hungary go to Vienna, and force the emperor and Hungarian king Ferdinand I of Austria to accept Hungarian claims for self-determination within the empire.
- March 18
  - At a Berlin barricade, fighting between revolutionaries and royalist forces marks the culmination of the German revolutions of 1848–49. As a result, King Frederick William IV of Prussia is forced to appoint a liberal government.
  - The Boston Public Library is founded by an act of the Great and General Court of Massachusetts.
- March 22 – The Republic of San Marco comes into existence in Venice.
- March 23 – The settlement of Dunedin, New Zealand is founded, with the arrival of settlers from Scotland on board the John Wickliffe.
- March 24 – The First Schleswig War (German: Schleswig-Holsteinischer Krieg, or Three Years' War (Danish: Treårskrigen)), a military conflict in southern Denmark and northern Germany rooted in the Schleswig-Holstein Question, contesting the issue of who should control the Duchies of Schleswig and Holstein, begins.
- March 29 – Queen's College, London, founded, the world's first school to award academic qualifications to young women.

=== April–June ===
- April 3 – The Chicago Board of Trade is founded by 82 Chicago merchants and business leaders.
- April 10
  - A Chartist 'Monster Rally' is held in Kennington Park London, headed by Feargus O'Connor. A petition demanding the franchise is presented to the Parliament of the United Kingdom.
  - The Illinois and Michigan Canal is completed.
- April 11 – The first Hungarian national government is formed, under the leadership of Lajos Batthyány. The April Laws, the first democratic revolutionary laws in Hungary, are promulgated, putting an end to the feudal privileges of the nobility and serfdom; proclaiming the freedom of religion, freedom of the press and foundation of the Hungarian National Bank; and organising the first democratic election in Hungary based in popular representation, a national guard and reunion of Transylvania with Hungary. The Habsburg emperor, and Hungarian king Ferdinand I of Austria, ratify these laws, which form the basis of modern Hungary.
- April 18 – The Second Anglo-Sikh War breaks out in the Punjab.
- April 25 – Captain Francis Crozier and Commander James Fitzjames of the Royal Navy deposit the final formal record ever recovered from the Franklin Expedition in a cairn on King William Island, after deserting their ships, HMS Erebus and HMS Terror, with their surviving 105 crew members on April 22 to attempt to march to the mainland of North America.
- April 27 – The second abolition of slavery in France and its colonies initiated by Victor Schœlcher.
- April 29 – Pope Pius IX publishes an allocution announcing his refusal to support Piedmont-Sardinia in its war with Austria, and dispelling hopes that he might serve as ruler of a pan-Italian republic. The allocution, by which Pius is seen to withdraw his moral support for the Italian unification movement, is a key first step in the soon-to-be crushing reaction against the revolutions of 1848.
- May 3 – The boar-crested Anglo-Saxon Benty Grange helmet is discovered in a barrow on the Benty Grange farm in Derbyshire.
- May 13 – "Maamme", the national anthem of Finland written by German composer Fredrik Pacius and Finnish poet Johan Ludvig Runeberg, was performed for the first time.
- May 15
  - Radicals invade the French Chamber of Deputies.
  - 40,000 Romanians meet at Câmpia Libertății in Blaj, to protest Transylvania becoming a part of Hungary.
- May 18 – The 'Frankfurt Parliament' (Nationalversammlung), the first German National Assembly, opens in Frankfurt.
- May 19 – The Treaty of Guadalupe Hidalgo of February 2, ending the Mexican–American War, is ratified by the Mexican government.
- May 29 – Wisconsin is admitted as the 30th U.S. state.
- May 30 – The Prudential Mutual Assurance Investment and Loan Association is established at Hatton Garden in London (England) to provide loans to professional and working people, origin of the multinational life insurance and financial services group.
- June – The Serbians from Vojvodina start a rebellion against the Hungarian government.
- June 2–12 – The Prague Slavic Congress brings together members of the Pan-Slavism movement.
- June 17 – The Austrian army bombards Prague, and crushes a working-class revolt.
- June 21 – Wallachian Revolution of 1848: The Proclamation of Islaz is made public, and a Romanian revolutionary government led by Ion Heliade Rădulescu and Christian Tell is created.
- June 22 – The French government dissolves the national workshops in Paris, giving the workers the choice of joining the army or going to workshops in the provinces. The following day, the June Days Uprising begins in response.
- June 24 – Anne Brontë published her final novel and her best-selling work, The Tenant of Wildfell Hall.

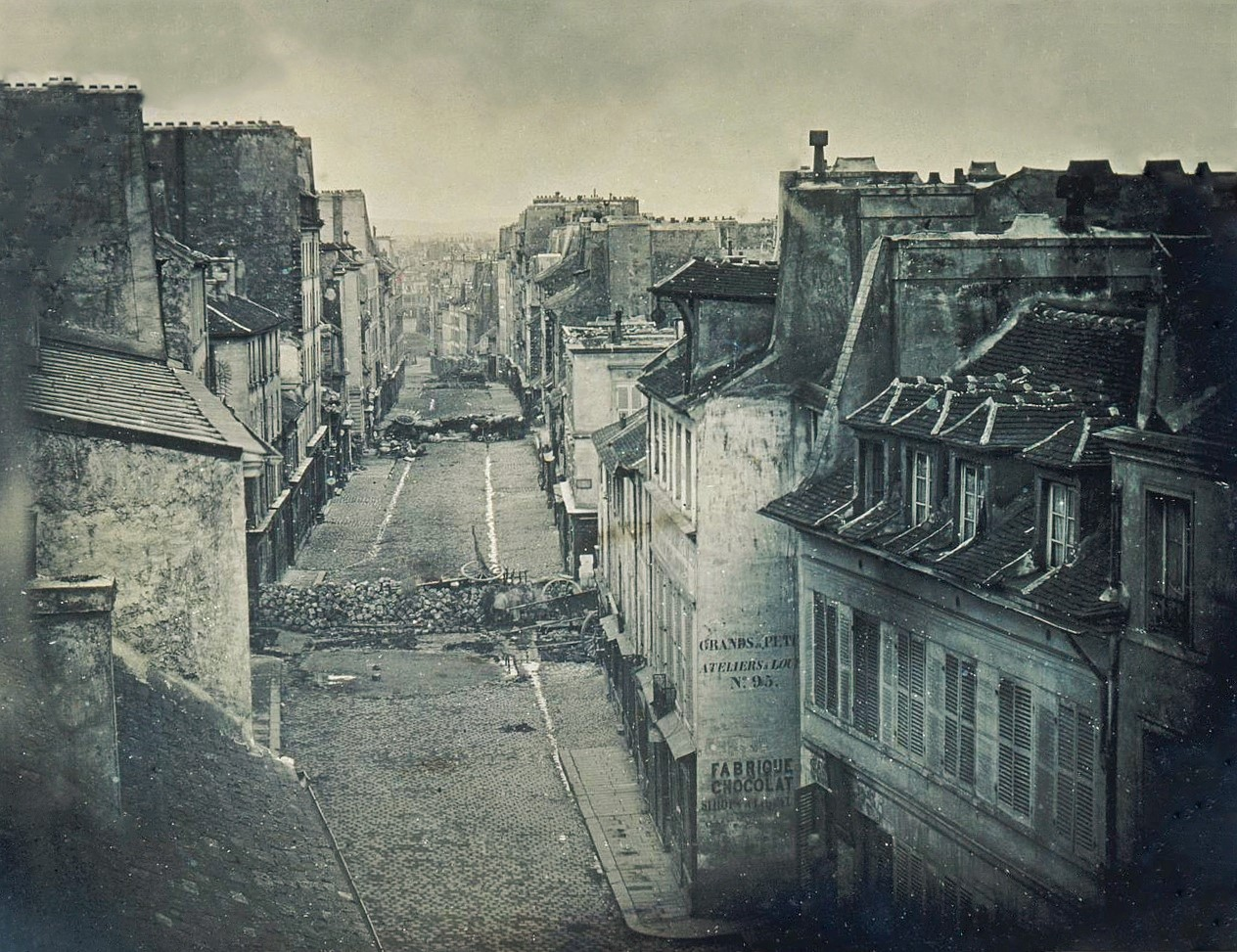
25 June: Barricades at rue Saint-Maur in Paris just before the attack of the army.

=== July–September ===
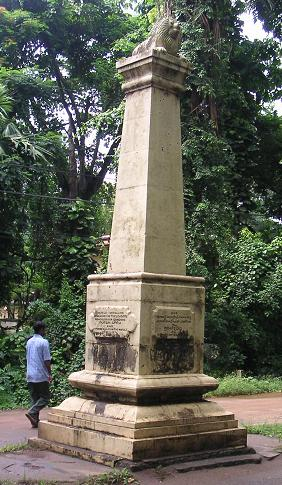
July 26: Matale Rebellion begins in Sri Lanka.

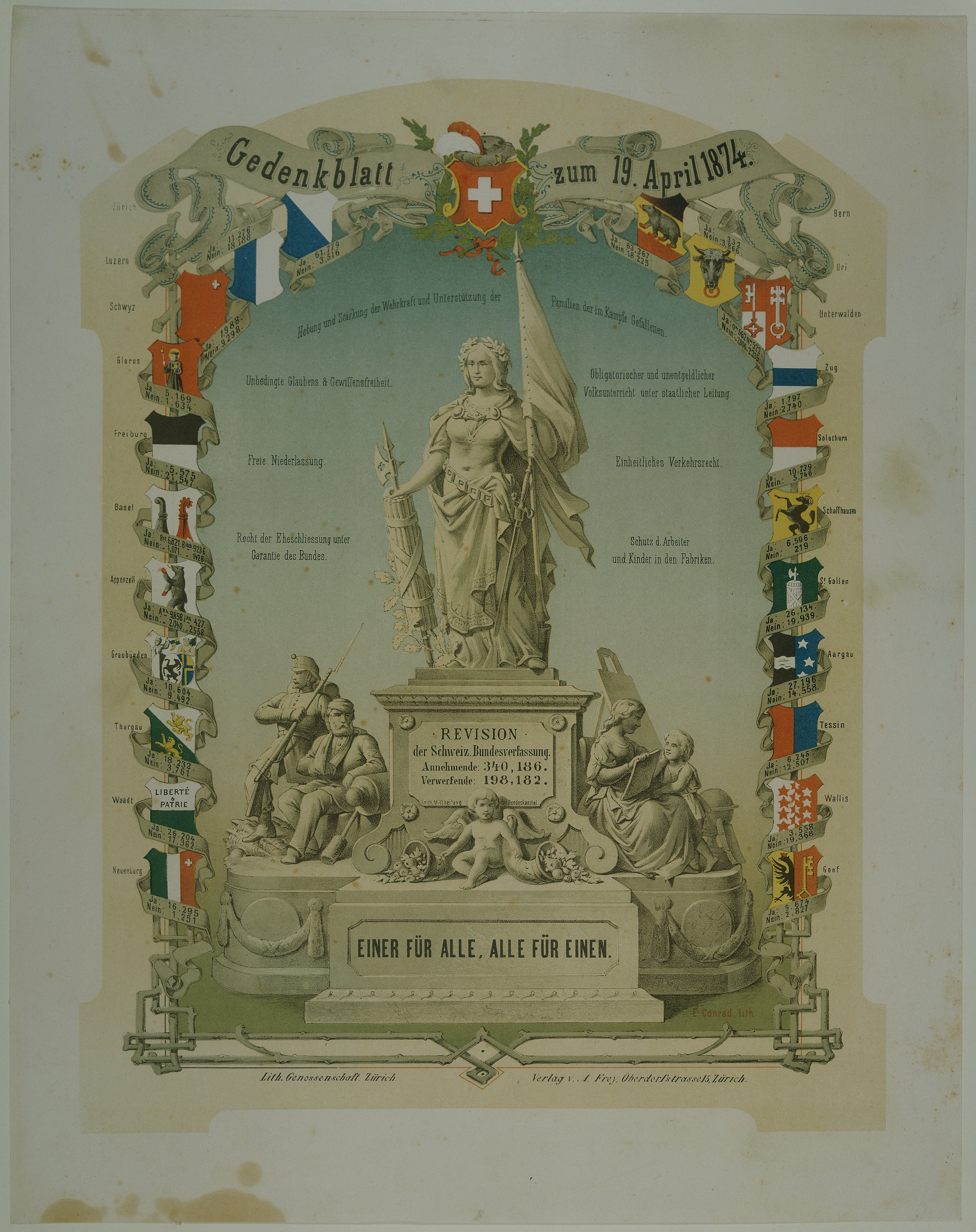
September 12: The Swiss Confederation reconstitutes itself as a federal republic.

- July – The Public Health Act establishes Boards of Health across England and Wales, the nation's first public health law, giving cities broad authority to build modern sanitary systems.
- July 3 – Governor-General Peter von Scholten emancipates all remaining slaves in the Danish West Indies
- July 5 – The Hungarian national revolutionary parliament starts to work.
- July 11 – Waterloo railway station in London opens.
- July 19 – Seneca Falls Convention: The 2-day women's rights convention opens in Seneca Falls, New York; "Bloomers" are introduced.
- July 26
  - The Matale Rebellion breaks out against British rule in Sri Lanka.
  - The University of Wisconsin–Madison is founded.
- July 29 – Young Irelander Rebellion: A nationalist revolt in County Tipperary, against British rule, is put down by the Irish Constabulary.
- August 6 – HMS Daedalus reports a sighting of a sea serpent.
- August 14 – American President James K. Polk annexes the Oregon Country, and renames it the Oregon Territory as part of the United States.
- August 17 – The Independent Republic of Yucatán officially unites with Mexico, in exchange for Mexican help in suppressing a revolt by the indigenous Maya population.
- August 19 – California Gold Rush: The New York Herald breaks the news to the East Coast of the United States that there is a gold rush in California (although the rush started in January).
- August 24 – The U.S. barque Ocean Monarch is burnt out off the Great Orme, North Wales, with the loss of 178, chiefly emigrants.
- August 28 – Louisy Mathieu becomes the first black member to join the French Parliament, as a representative of Guadeloupe.
- September 10 – The Austrian commander Karl von Urban makes the first stand against the Revolution in Hungary, assembling in his headquarters in Năsăud hundreds of delegates from all districts of the Principality of Transylvania. As a result, 918 communities in the region distance themselves from the Revolution.
- September 11 – The Croatian army of Josip Jelačić, encouraged in secret by the Habsburg government, crosses the Drava River and attacks Hungary, with the goal of ending the revolution in that country.
- September 12 – One of the successes of the Revolutions of 1848, the Swiss Federal Constitution, patterned on the Constitution of the United States, enters into force, creating a federal republic, and one of the first modern democratic states in Europe.
- September 13 – Vermont railroad worker Phineas Gage survives a 3-foot-plus iron rod being driven through his head.
- September 16 – William Cranch Bond and William Lassell discover Hyperion, Saturn's moon.
- September 25 – The Hungarian king and Habsburg emperor Ferdinand V refuses to recognise the Hungarian government, led by Lajos Batthyány. The Batthyány government resigns and the National Defence Committee is formed, which is a temporary crisis government, totally independent from Vienna, under the leadership of Lajos Kossuth.
- September 26 – The University of Ottawa is founded in Canada as the College of Bytown, a Roman Catholic institution.
- September 29 – Battle of Pákozd: The Hungarian revolutionary army, led by János Móga, defeats the Croatian army of Josip Jelačić, forcing him to retreat towards Vienna.

September 24: a huge panorama of Cincinnati is shot. It is the widest of its era and the most old of all the North American panoramas.

=== October–December ===
- October 2 – The National Defence Committee (Országos Honvédelmi Bizottmány), led by Lajos Kossuth, becomes the executive power in Hungary, after the resignation of the Lajos Batthyány government.
- October 3 – General Anton Puchner, commander of the Austrian armies of Transylvania, declares insurrection against Hungary, and, together with Karl von Urban in the north and the Romanian insurgents led by Avram Iancu, attacks and chases away the Hungarian armed forces occupying Transylvania.
- October 18 – Elizabeth Gaskell's first novel, Mary Barton: A Tale of Manchester Life, is published anonymously in London.
- October 24 – Romanian bands massacre 640 Hungarian civilians at the town of Zlatna, Transylvania. The massacre continues into 1849.
- October 28 – In Catalonia, Spain, the Barcelona–Mataró railroad route (the first to be constructed in the Iberian Peninsula) is inaugurated.
- October 30 – Battle of Schwechat: Hungarian forces which crossed the Austrian border, in order to unite with the Viennese revolutionaries, are defeated by the imperial army, led by Alfred I, Prince of Windisch-Grätz and Josip Jelačić.
- October 31 – Vienna is occupied by the imperial forces led by Alfred I, Prince of Windisch-Grätz, who crushes the revolution here.
- November 1 – In Boston, Massachusetts, the first medical school for women, the Boston Female Medical School (which later merges with Boston University School of Medicine), opens.
- November 3 – A new Constitution of the Netherlands (drafted by Johan Rudolph Thorbecke), severely limiting the power of the monarchy and introducing representative democracy, is proclaimed.
- November 4 – France ratifies a new constitution. The French Second Republic is set up, ending the state of temporary government.
- November 7 – 1848 United States presidential election: Whig Zachary Taylor of Louisiana defeats Democrat Lewis Cass of Michigan, in the first U.S. presidential election held in every state on the same day.
- November 13 – At the Battle of Gherla, the Austrian commander Karl von Urban wins a victory with his force of 3.000 against the 12.000-strong Hungarian Revolutionary Army led by Manó Baldacci, the Hungarian commander-in-chief in Transylvania.
- November 17 – Karl von Urban liberates Klausenburg (Cluj-Napoca/Kolozsvár), the capital of the Principality of Transylvania, during the Hungarian Revolutionary War.
- November 24
  - Pope Pius IX flees Rome in disguise for Naples.
  - At the Battle of Des, Karl von Urban, with 1.500 men, defeats a Hungarian army of 10.000 led by Katona Miklós.
- December 2 – Emperor Ferdinand I of Austria abdicates in favour of his nephew, Franz Joseph I, who will serve as Emperor of Austria and King of Hungary and Bohemia, until his death in 1916.
- December 6 – The Austrian imperial army, led by Franz Schlik, attacks Hungary.
- December 10 – Prince Louis-Napoléon Bonaparte is elected first president of the French Second Republic.
- December 16 – The main Austrian imperial forces, led by Alfred I, Prince of Windisch-Grätz, cross the Hungarian border.
- December 18 – Punta Arenas, the first major settlement in the Strait of Magellan, is founded.
- December 20
  - President Louis-Napoleon Bonaparte takes his oath of office in front of the French National Assembly.
  - Slavery is abolished in Réunion (this day is celebrated every year from 1981).
- December 25 – Hungarian forces, led by Józef Bem, enter Kolozsvár (Cluj), after defeating the Austrian armies in northern Transylvania.
- December 30 – Battle of Mór: The imperial army, led by Josip Jelačić, defeats the Hungarian army, led by Mór Perczel.

=== Date unknown ===
- British, Dutch, and German governments lay claim to New Guinea.
- Admiral Nevelskoy demonstrates that the Strait of Tartary is a strait.
- Labuan is made a British Crown colony.
- The city of Joensuu is founded in North Karelia, Finland by Czar Nicholas I of Russia.
- The University of Mississippi admits its first students.
- Geneva College (Pennsylvania) is founded as Geneva Hall in Northwood, Logan County, Ohio.
- Rhodes College is founded in Clarksville, Tennessee, as the Masonic University of Tennessee.
- The Shaker song "Simple Gifts" is written by Joseph Brackett in Alfred, Maine.
- Richard Wagner begins writing the libretto that will become Der Ring des Nibelungen ("The Ring of the Nibelung").
- Watch brand Omega is founded by Louis Brandt in Switzerland.

=== Ongoing events ===
- Great Famine (Ireland) (1845–52).

== Births ==
=== January–March ===
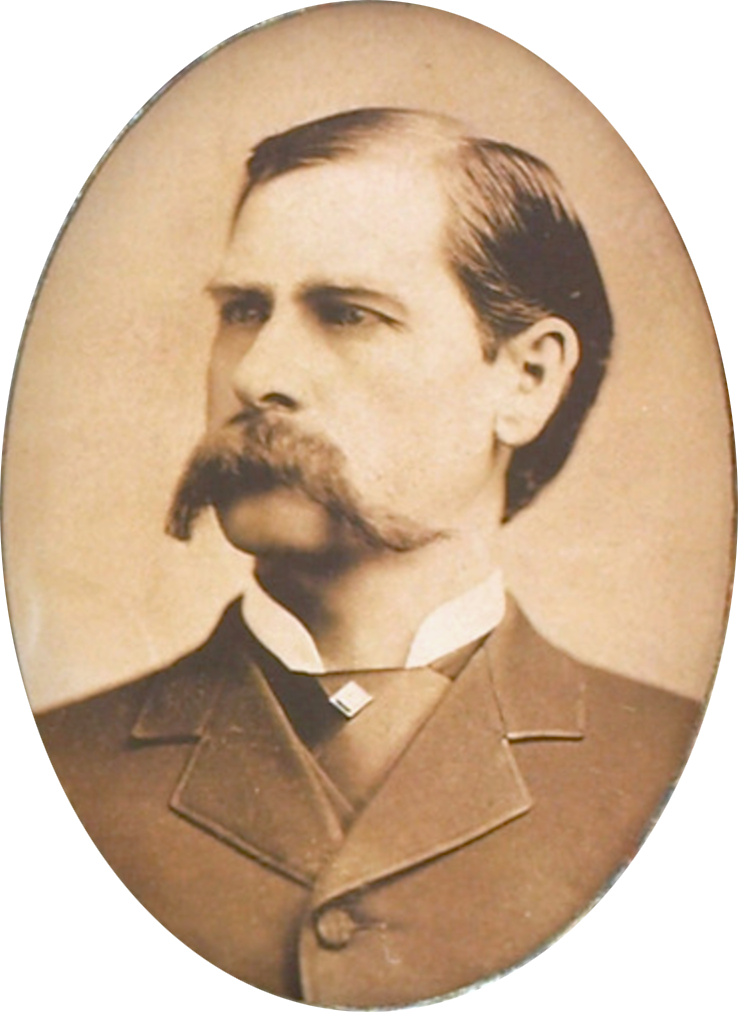
Wyatt Earp

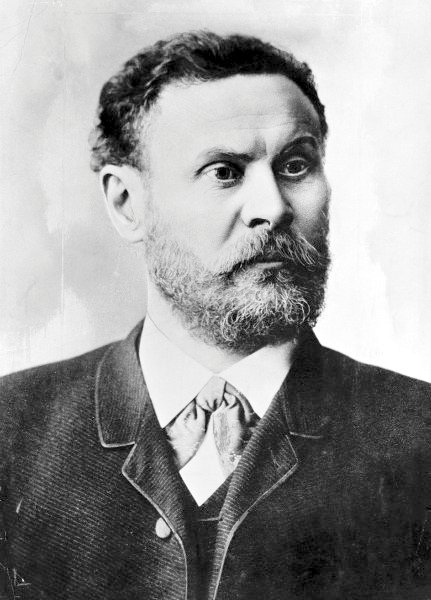
Otto Lilienthal

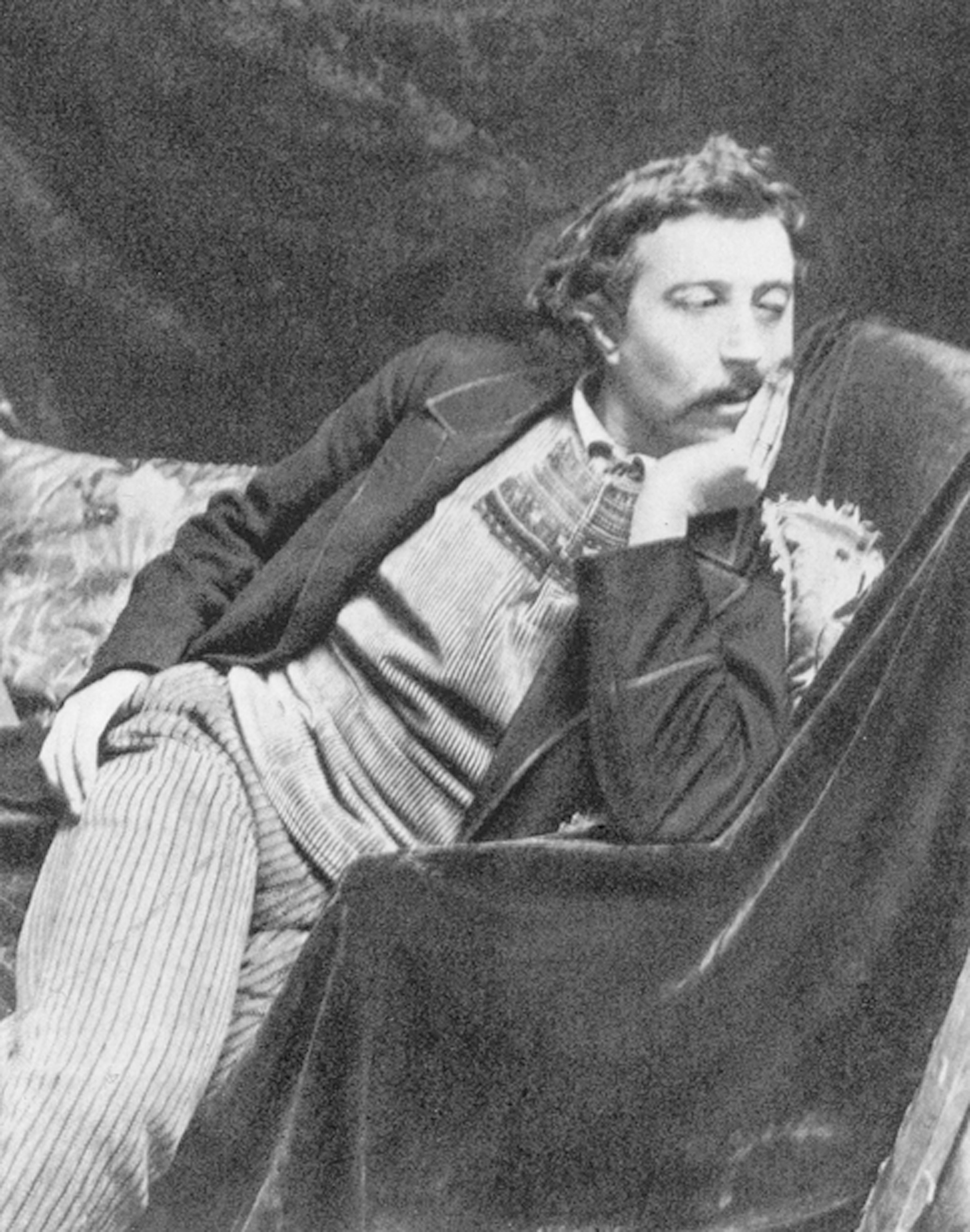
Paul Gauguin

- January 4 – Katsura Tarō, 6th prime minister of Japan (d. 1913)
- January 6 – Hristo Botev, Bulgarian revolutionary (d. 1876)
- January 21 – Henri Duparc, French composer (d. 1933)
- January 24 – Vasily Surikov, Russian painter (d. 1916)
- January 27 – Tōgō Heihachirō, Japanese admiral (d. 1934)
- February 5
  - Joris-Karl Huysmans, French author (d. 1907)
  - Belle Starr, American outlaw (d. 1889)
- February 13 – Hermann von Eichhorn, German field marshal (d. 1918)
- February 14 – Benjamin Baillaud, French astronomer (d. 1934)
- February 16
  - Octave Mirbeau, French art critic, novelist (d. 1917)
  - Hugo de Vries, Dutch botanist and geneticist (d. 1935)
- February 18 – Louis Comfort Tiffany, American glass artist (d. 1933)
- February 24
  - Grant Allen, Canadian author (d. 1899)
  - Andrew Inglis Clark, Australian jurist and politician (d. 1907)
- February 25 – King William II of Württemberg (d. 1921)
- February 27 – Sir Hubert Parry, English composer (d. 1918)
- March 3 – Adelaide Neilson, English actress (d. 1880)
- March 17 – Ernesta Forti, Italian anarchist and dairy worker
- March 18 – Princess Louise, Duchess of Argyll, daughter of Queen Victoria (d. 1939)
- March 19 – Wyatt Earp, American lawman and gunfighter (d. 1929)
- March 21 – David McNair, Scottish plasterer and amateur footballer (Falkirk F.C.) (d.1935)
- March 29 – Aleksey Kuropatkin, Russian general, Imperial Russian Minister of War (d. 1925)
- March 31 – William Waldorf Astor, American-born British financier and statesman (d. 1919)

=== April–June ===
- April 3 – Arturo Prat, Chilean lawyer and navy officer (d. 1879)
- April 7 – Randall Davidson, British Archbishop of Canterbury (d. 1930)
- April 10 – Hubertine Auclert, French feminist (d. 1914)
- April 27 – King Otto of Bavaria (d. 1916)
- May 3 – Francisco Teixeira de Queiroz, Portuguese writer (d. 1919)
- May 10 – Sir Thomas Lipton, Scottish retailer and yachtsman (d. 1931)
- May 20 – Howard Vernon, Australian actor (d. 1921)
- May 23
  - Otto Lilienthal, German engineer, aviation pioneer (d. 1896)
- May 25
  - Helmuth von Moltke the Younger, German general (d. 1916)
- June 7
  - Paul Gauguin, French artist (d. 1903)
  - Dolores Jiménez y Muro, Mexican revolutionary and educator (d. 1925)
- June 13 – Cornélie Huygens, Dutch writer, social democrat and feminist (d. 1902)
- June 15 – Sol Smith Russell, American stage comedian (d. 1902)
- June 19 – Mary R. Platt Hatch, American author (d. 1935)
- June 25 – Thomas Henry Tracy, Canadian architect and alderman (d. 1925)

=== July–September ===
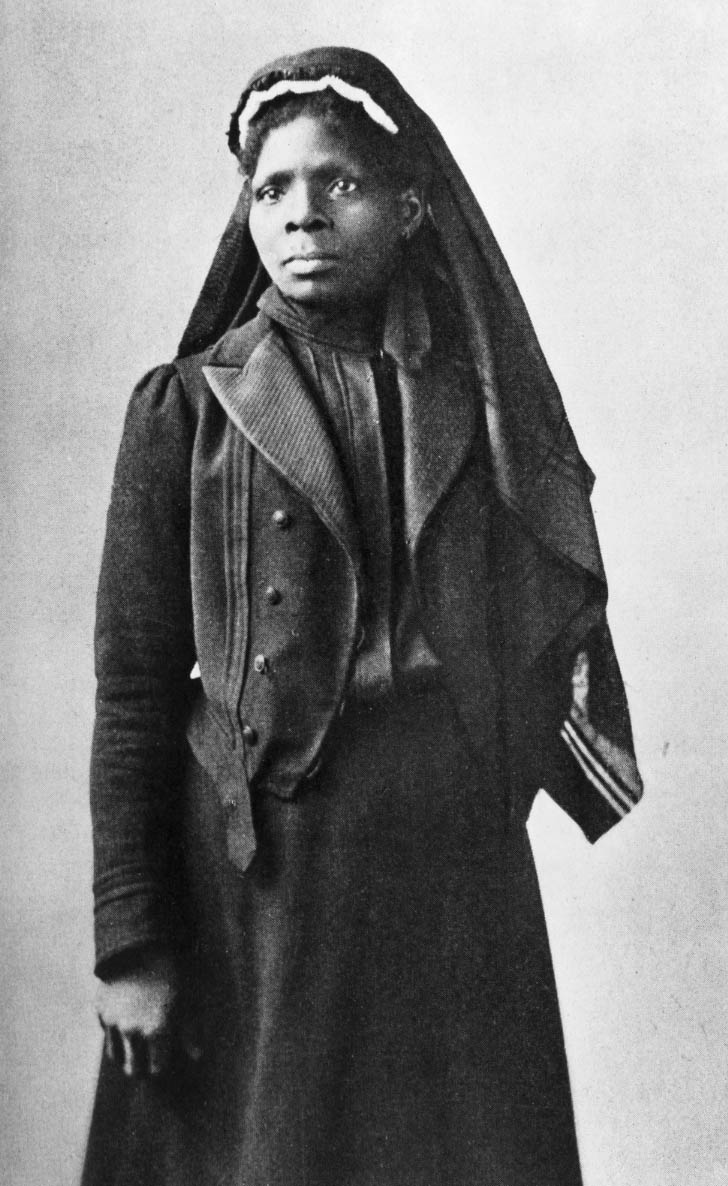
Susie Taylor

- July 3 – Lothar von Trotha, German military commander (d. 1920)
- July 6 – Gábor Baross, Hungarian statesman (d. 1892)
- July 7 – Rodrigues Alves, 5th president of Brazil (d. 1919)
- July 9 – Robert I, Duke of Parma, last ruling Duke of Parma (d. 1907)
- July 10 – Anatoly Stessel, Russian baron and general (d. 1915)
- July 15 – Vilfredo Pareto, Italian economist (d. 1923)
- July 18 – W. G. Grace, English cricketer (d. 1915)
- July 22
  - Adolphus Frederick V, Grand Duke of Mecklenburg-Strelitz (d. 1914)
  - Winfield Scott Stratton, American miner (d. 1902)
- July 25 – Arthur Balfour, Prime Minister of the United Kingdom (d. 1930)
- July 31 – Jean-Baptiste Olive, French painter (d. 1936)
- August 6 – Susie Taylor, African American nurse and first nurse in the Black Army (d. 1912)
- August 15 – António Enes, Portuguese writer and politician (d. 1901)
- August 19 – Gustave Caillebotte, French painter (d. 1894)
- August 24 – Kate Claxton, American actress (d. 1924)
- August 30 – Gheorghe Bengescu, Romanian diplomat and man of letters (d. 1922)
- September 3
  - Emory Speer, American politician, jurist, and United States district judge from 1885 until 1918 (d. 1918)
  - Temulji Bhicaji Nariman, Indian physician and obstetrician (d. 1940)
- September 4 – Lewis Howard Latimer, African-American inventor (d. 1928)
- September 8 – Viktor Meyer, German chemist (d. 1897)
- September 20 – Friedrich Soennecken, German entrepreneur, inventor of the hole punch and ringbinder (d. 1919)

=== October–December ===
- October 3 – Henry Lerolle, French painter (d. 1929)
- October 5 – Liborius Ritter von Frank, Austro-Hungarian general (d. 1935)
- October 15 – Harmon Northrop Morse, American chemist (d. 1920)
- November 8 – Gottlob Frege, German logician (d. 1925)
- November 11 – Zinovy Rozhestvensky, Russian admiral (d. 1909)
- November 12 – Eduard Müller, member of the Swiss Federal Council (d. 1919)
- November 13 – Albert I, Prince of Monaco (d. 1922)
- November 14 – Sándor Wekerle, 3-time prime minister of Hungary (d. 1921)
- November 20 – James M. Spangler, American inventor (d. 1915)
- November 24 – Zhang Peilun, Chinese naval commander and government official (d. 1903)
- November 25 – Margaret Abigail Cleaves, American physician and writer (d. 1917)
- November 27 – Maximilian von Prittwitz, German general (d. 1917)
- November 29 – Paul Pau, French general (d. 1932)
- December 6 – Johann Palisa, Austrian astronomer (d. 1925)
- December 17 – William Wynn Westcott, British freemason (d. 1925)

=== Date unknown ===
- Alexander Bedward, Jamaican preacher (d. 1930)
- Alice Williams Brotherton, American author (d. 1930)
- Maryana Marrash, Syrian writer, salonist (d. 1919)
- Mírzá Mihdí, youngest child of Baháʼí founder Baháʼu'lláh (d. 1870)
- Viktor Sakharov, Russian general (d. 1905)
- Mary Thomas (labor leader), (d. 1905)

== Deaths ==
=== January–June ===
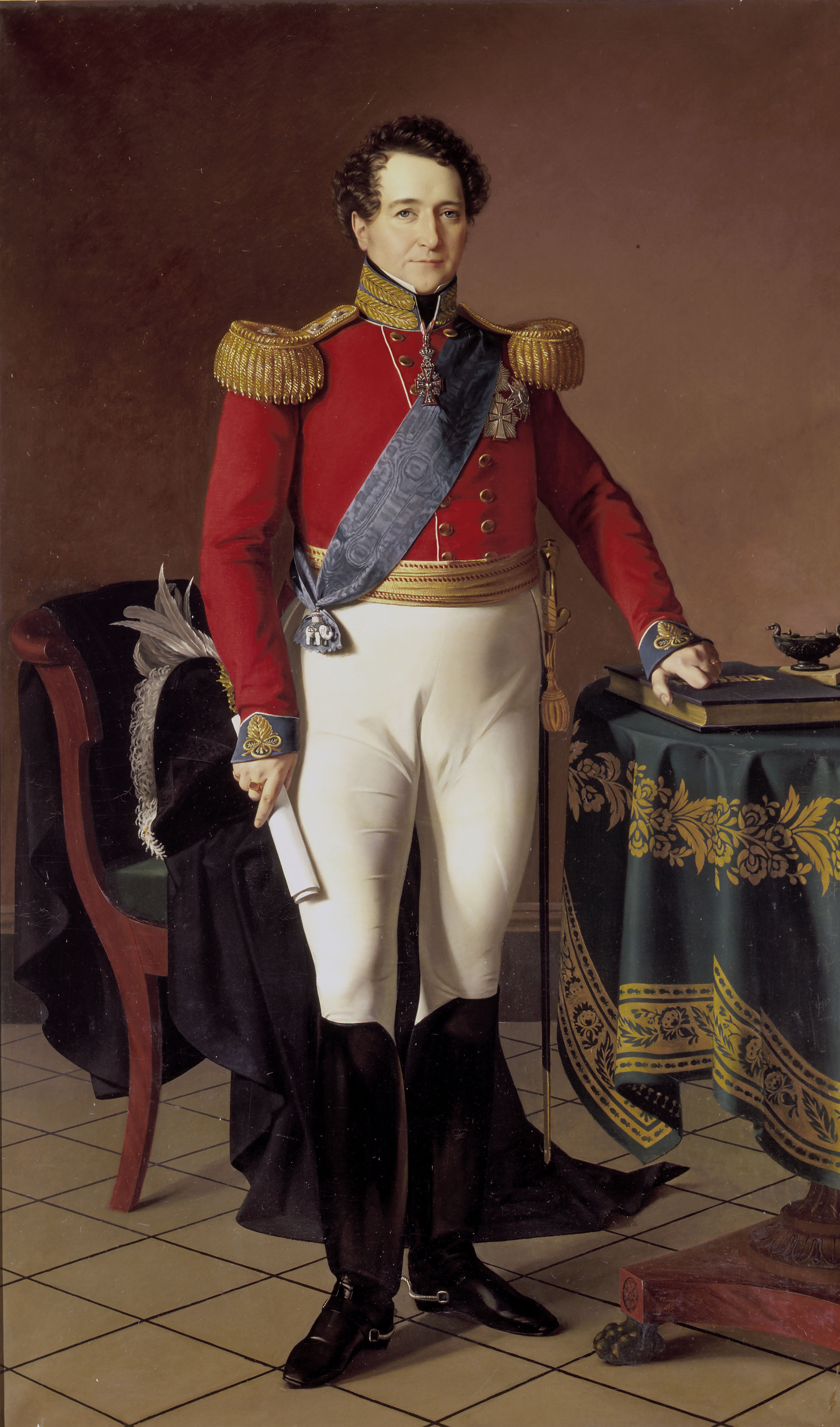
Christian VIII. of Denmark

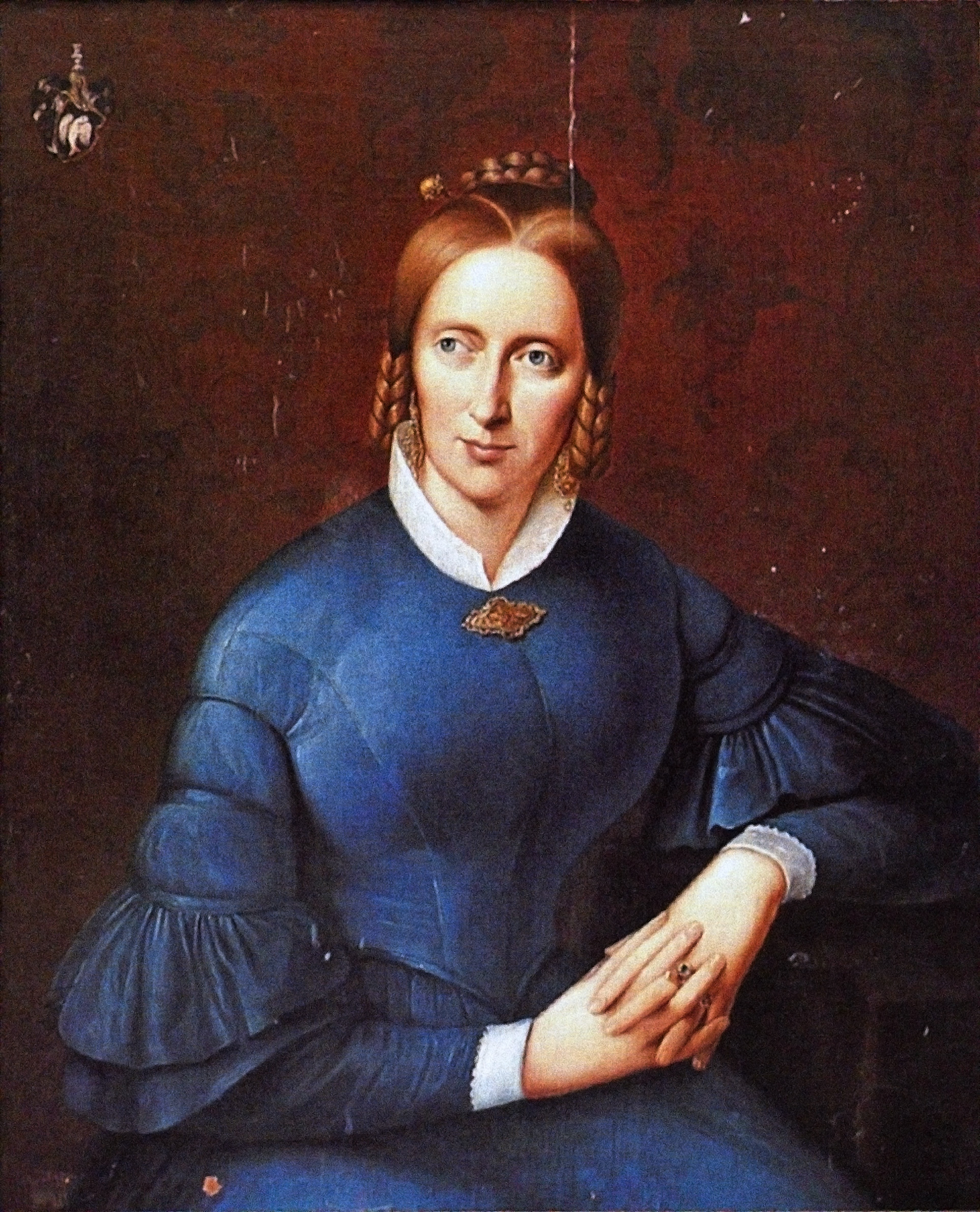
Annette von Droste-Hülshoff

- January 9 – Caroline Herschel, German astronomer (b. 1750)
- January 17 – Petrobey Mavromichalis, Prime Minister of Greece (b. 1765)
- January 19 – Isaac D'Israeli, English author (b. 1766)
- January 20 – Christian VIII, King of Denmark (b. 1786)
- February 15 – Hermann von Boyen, Prussian field marshal (b. 1771)
- February 22 – Wilhelmine Reichard, first German woman balloonist (b. 1788)
- February 23 – John Quincy Adams, 6th President of the United States, son of John Adams and Abigail Adams (b. 1767)
- March 29 – John Jacob Astor, American businessman (b. 1763)
- April 8 – Gaetano Donizetti, Italian composer (b. 1797)
- April 10 – Godert van der Capellen, Dutch colonial governor (b. 1778)
- May 24 – Annette von Droste-Hülshoff, German writer (b. 1797)
- June 11 – Parashuramrao Shrinivas I (b. 1777)
- June 23 – Archduchess Maria Leopoldine of Austria-Este (b. 1776)
- June 27 – Denis Auguste Affre, Archbishop of Paris (b. 1793)

=== July–December ===
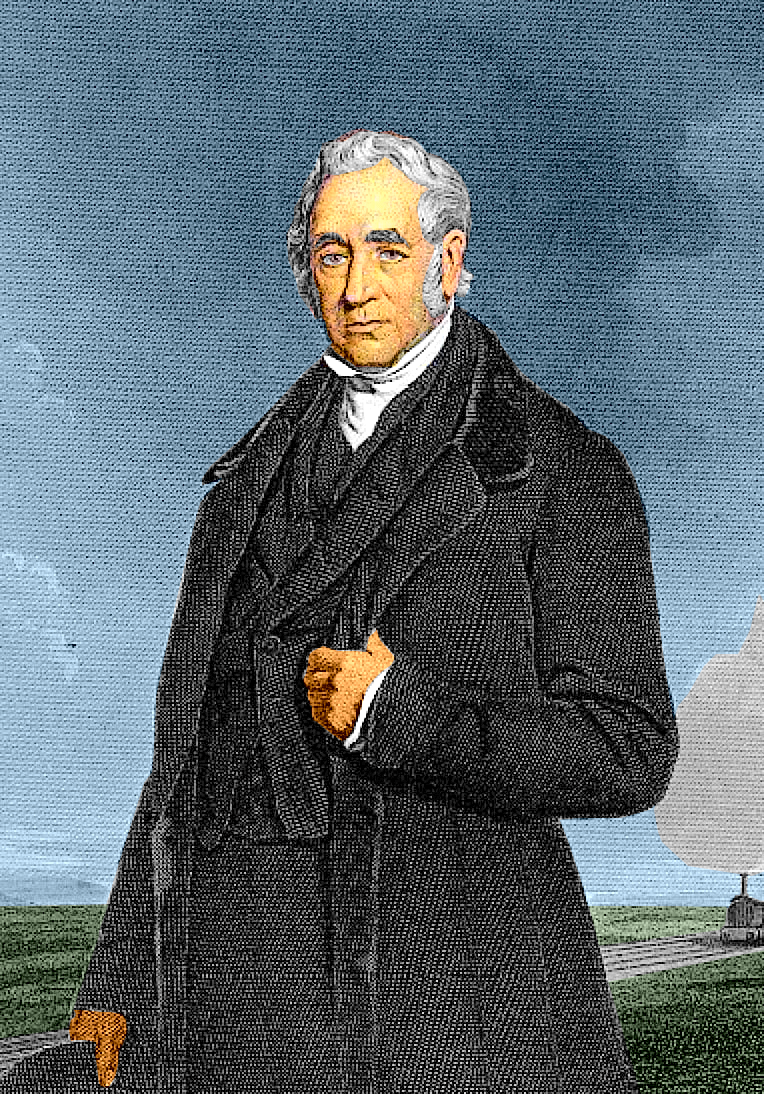
George Stephenson

- July 4 – François-René de Chateaubriand, French writer, diplomat (b. 1768)
- July 9 – Jaime Balmes, Spanish philosopher, theologian (b. 1810)
- July 10 – Karoline Jagemann, German actor (b. 1777)
- July 20 – Francis R. Shunk, American politician (b. 1788)
- August 3 – Edward Baines, British newspaperman, politician (b. 1774)
- August 5 – Pedro Vélez, Mexican politician (b. 1787)
- August 7 – Jöns Jacob Berzelius, Swedish chemist (b. 1779)
- August 8 – Puran Appu, Sri Lankan hero who led the Matale rebellion against the British (b. 1812)
- August 9 – Frederick Marryat, British novelist (b. 1792)
- August 12 – George Stephenson, English locomotive pioneer (Locomotion No. 1 & Rocket) (b. 1781)
- August 14 – Sarah Fuller Flower Adams, English hymnwriter (b. 1805)
- August 30 – Simon Willard, celebrated American horologist (b. 1753)
- September 18 – Hans Adolf Erdmann von Auerswald, Prussian general and politician, (b. 1792)
- September 18 – Felix Lichnowsky, German politician (b. 1814)
- September 24 – Branwell Brontë, English painter, poet, brother of novelists Charlotte, Emily and Anne (b. 1817)
- October 28 – Harrison Gray Otis, American politician (b. 1765)
- November 8 – Moseley Baker, American politician (b. 1802)
- November 9 – Robert Blum, German politician (b. 1810)
- November 10 – Ibrahim Pasha of Egypt, military leader (b. 1789)
- November 23 – Sir John Barrow, English statesman (b. 1764)
- November 24 – William Lamb, 2nd Viscount Melbourne, Prime Minister of the United Kingdom (b. 1779)
- December 1 – Kyokutei Bakin, Japanese author (b. 1767)
- December 18 – Bernard Bolzano, Bohemian mathematician, logician, philosopher and theologian (b. 1781)
- December 19 – Emily Brontë, English author (b. 1818)

== See also ==
- 1848 in architecture
- 1848 in literature
- 1848 in science
