= Francisco Teixeira =

Francisco Teixeira may refer to:

- Francisco Teixeira de Queiroz (1848–1919), Portuguese writer
- Francisco Gomes Teixeira (1851–1933), Portuguese mathematician
- Francisco Nunes Teixeira (1910–1999), Portuguese bishop
- Francisco Teixeira (footballer) (born 1998), Portuguese footballer
