= Gremio (disambiguation) =

Grêmio FBPA is a Brazilian football club based in Porto Alegre, with an affiliated women's and youth teams.

Gremio, Grémio or Grêmio (Portuguese word for "guild") may also refer to:

== Sport clubs ==
=== Rio Grande do Sul state ===
- Grêmio Atlético Farroupilha, Brazilian football club based in Pelotas
- Grêmio Esportivo Bagé, Brazilian football club based in Bagé
- Grêmio Esportivo Brasil, Brazilian football club based in Pelotas
- Grêmio Esportivo Glória, Brazilian football club based in Vacaria
- Grêmio Esportivo São José, Brazilian football club based in Cachoeira do Sul
- Grêmio Esportivo Sapucaiense, Brazilian football club based in Sapucaia do Sul
- Grêmio Foot-Ball Santanense, Brazilian football club based in Santana do Livramento

=== São Paulo ===
- Grêmio Barueri Futebol, Brazilian football club based in Barueri
- Grêmio Catanduvense de Futebol, Brazilian football club based in Catanduva
- Grêmio Esportivo Catanduvense, defunct Brazilian football club
- Grêmio Esportivo Mauaense, Brazilian football club based in Mauá
- Grêmio Esportivo Novorizontino, Brazilian football club based in Novo Horizonte
- Grêmio Esportivo Osasco, Brazilian football club based in Osasco
- Grêmio Esportivo Sãocarlense, Brazilian football club based in São Carlos
- Grêmio Asistencial e Cultural, or GECEBS, Brazilian baseball club playing in the Brazilian Baseball Championship

=== Santa Catarina ===
- Grêmio Esportivo Juventus, Brazilian football club based in Jaraguá do Sul
- Grêmio Esportivo Olímpico, Brazilian football club based in Blumenau

=== Amazonas ===
- Grêmio Atlético Coariense, Brazilian football club based in Coari

=== Goiás ===
- Grêmio Esportivo Anápolis, Brazilian football club based in Anápolis
- Grêmio Esportivo Inhumense, Brazilian football club based in Inhumas

=== Paraná ===
- Grêmio de Esportes Maringá, Brazilian football club based in Maringá

=== Pernambuco ===
- Grêmio Esportivo Petribu, Brazilian football club

=== Mato Grosso ===
- Grêmio Esportivo Jaciara, Brazilian football club based in Jaciara

=== Distrito Federal ===
- Grêmio Esportivo Tiradentes, Brazilian football club based in Brasília

=== Rondônia ===
- Grêmio Recreativo e Esportivo, Brazilian football club based in Espigão d'Oeste

=== Roraima ===
- Grêmio Atlético Sampaio, Brazilian football club based in Boa Vista, Roraima

=== Porto Alegre ===
- Grêmio Esportivo Renner, a Brazilian football club from Porto Alegre

== Other ==
- Grémio Literário (Literary Guild), a private club in Lisbon, Portugal
- Gremio Lusitano, an amateur football team from Ludlow, Massachusetts
- Arena do Grêmio, a multi-use stadium in Porto Alegre, Brazil
- Gremio (Suikoden), fictional character
- Gremio, an elderly suitor of Bianca in The Taming of the Shrew

== People ==
- Michael Gremio (born Michael Smith, 1983), former lead vocalist of the power metal band Cellador
