= Chalet and Garden of the Countess of Edla =

19th-century country residence in Portugal

- The Chalet
- Interactive map of Chalet and Garden of the Countess of Edla
- 38.7851°N 9.3991°W
- Location: Sintra, Portugal

History
- Built: 1864-69

Site notes
- Architectural style: Swiss Chalet

The Chalet and Garden of the Countess of Edla (Portuguese: Chalet e Jardim da Condessa d'Edla), also known as the Casa do Regalo, are in the Municipality of Sintra, in the Lisbon District of Portugal. They are situated on the western side of the park that surrounds the Pena Palace, and are part of the Sintra Cultural Landscape, classified by UNESCO as a World Heritage Site since 1995. They are also part of the Sintra-Cascais Natural Park.

== History ==
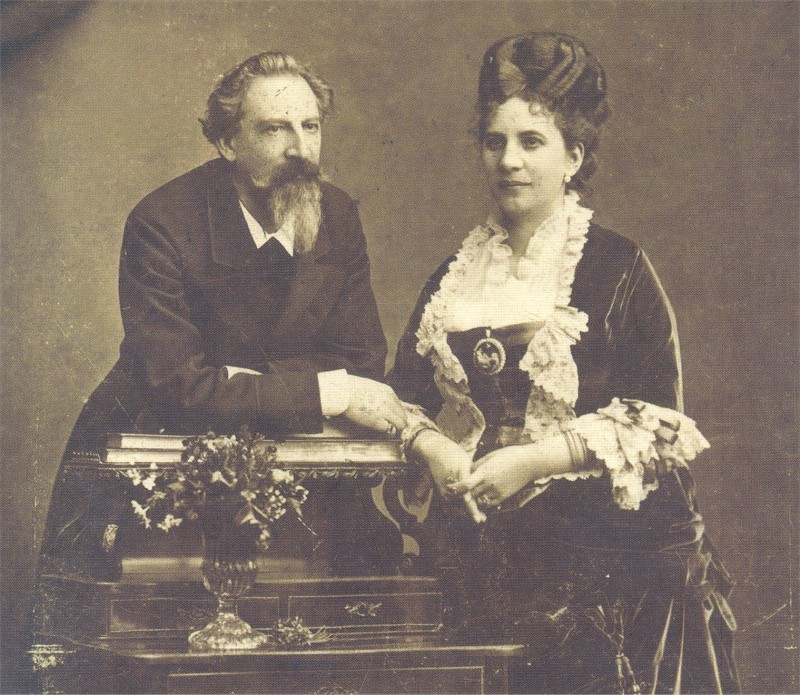
Photograph of the countess of Edla with king Ferdinand II

The Chalet was built between 1864 and 1869 for King Fernando II (1816–85), King-Consort to Queen Maria II until her death in 1853, and his future second wife, Elise, Countess of Edla (1836–1929), who was a Swiss-born, American-naturalized opera singer. The relationship between Fernando and Elise is considered to be one of the great love stories of Portuguese history. It caused considerable scandal because they wanted to marry, although she was a commoner who had, moreover, a young daughter with an unknown father. The couple finally managed to marry in 1869 when Fernando persuaded his cousin, Ernest II, Duke of Saxe-Coburg and Gotha, to create a title for Elise, enabling her to become Countess of Edla.

The couple planned the chalet to be in the style of a typical Swiss Chalet, that was much in vogue throughout Europe at the time. They constructed the building as they went along, without plans, with the assistance of a local builder known as Gregório. This lack of plans would subsequently cause problems for the restorers at the beginning of the 20th century.

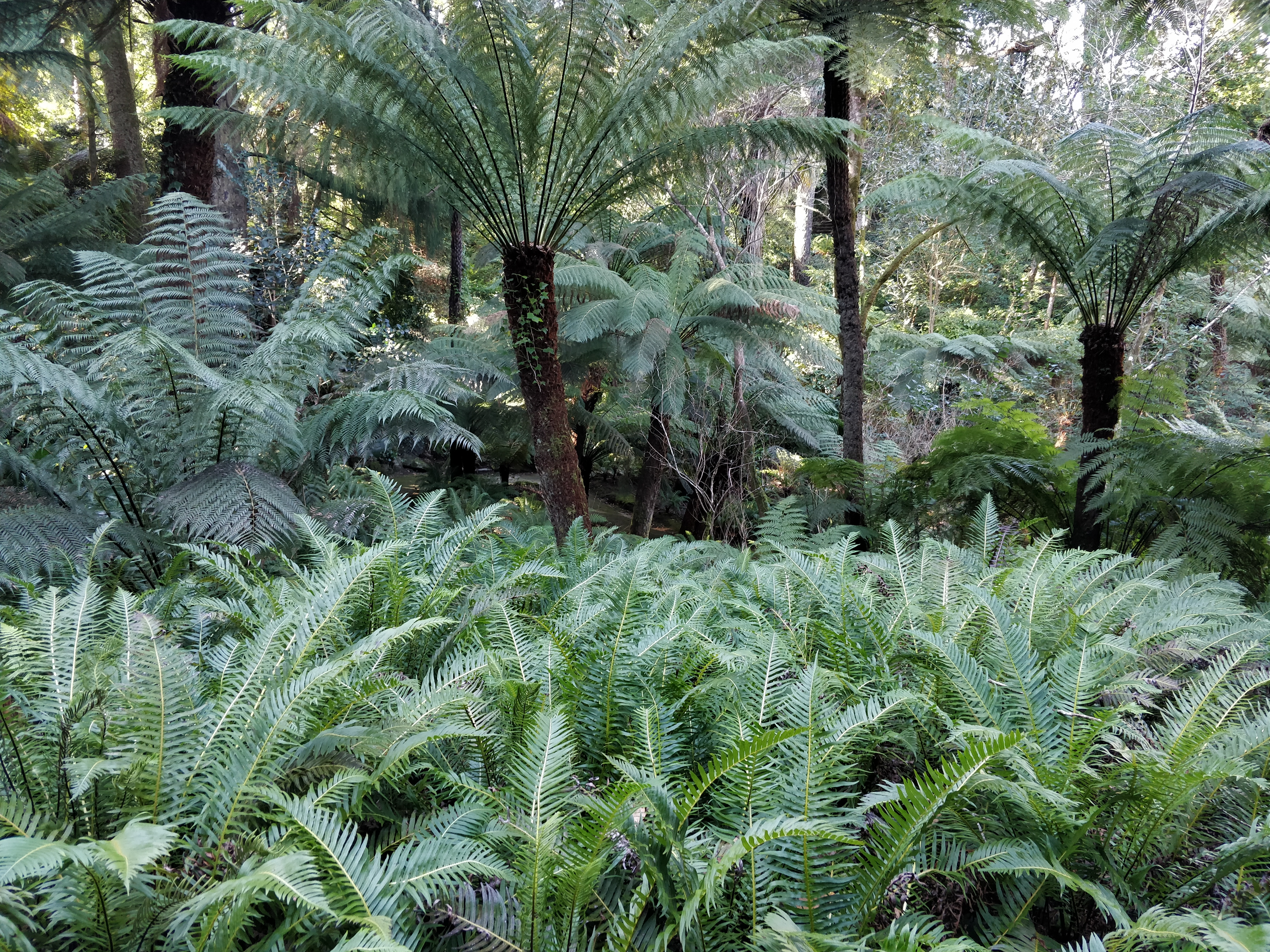
The fern garden close to the Chalet

The chalet was surrounded by a garden, with mature trees, lakes and flowering bushes. It now forms part of the park surrounding the Pena Palace. Among the 200 botanical species are camellias, rhododendrons, azaleas and a large collection of ferns from Australia and New Zealand. Trees were introduced from North America, with the assistance of John Slade, an American forester who was Elise's brother-in-law.

Fernando left the Pena Palace, park and gardens to the Countess in his will. However, the Portuguese State bought the property from her, believing it to be too important to be in the hands of a foreigner and the second wife of the deceased king. With some of the proceeds the Countess continued to give scholarships to the pianist and composer José Vianna da Motta and to Rafael Bordalo Pinheiro an artist and cartoonist. She also supported the Sintra branch of the Santa Casa da Misericórdia, a charity first set up in 1545. The Countess would visit the Chalet for four months a year until 1910. She died in 1929 in Lisbon.

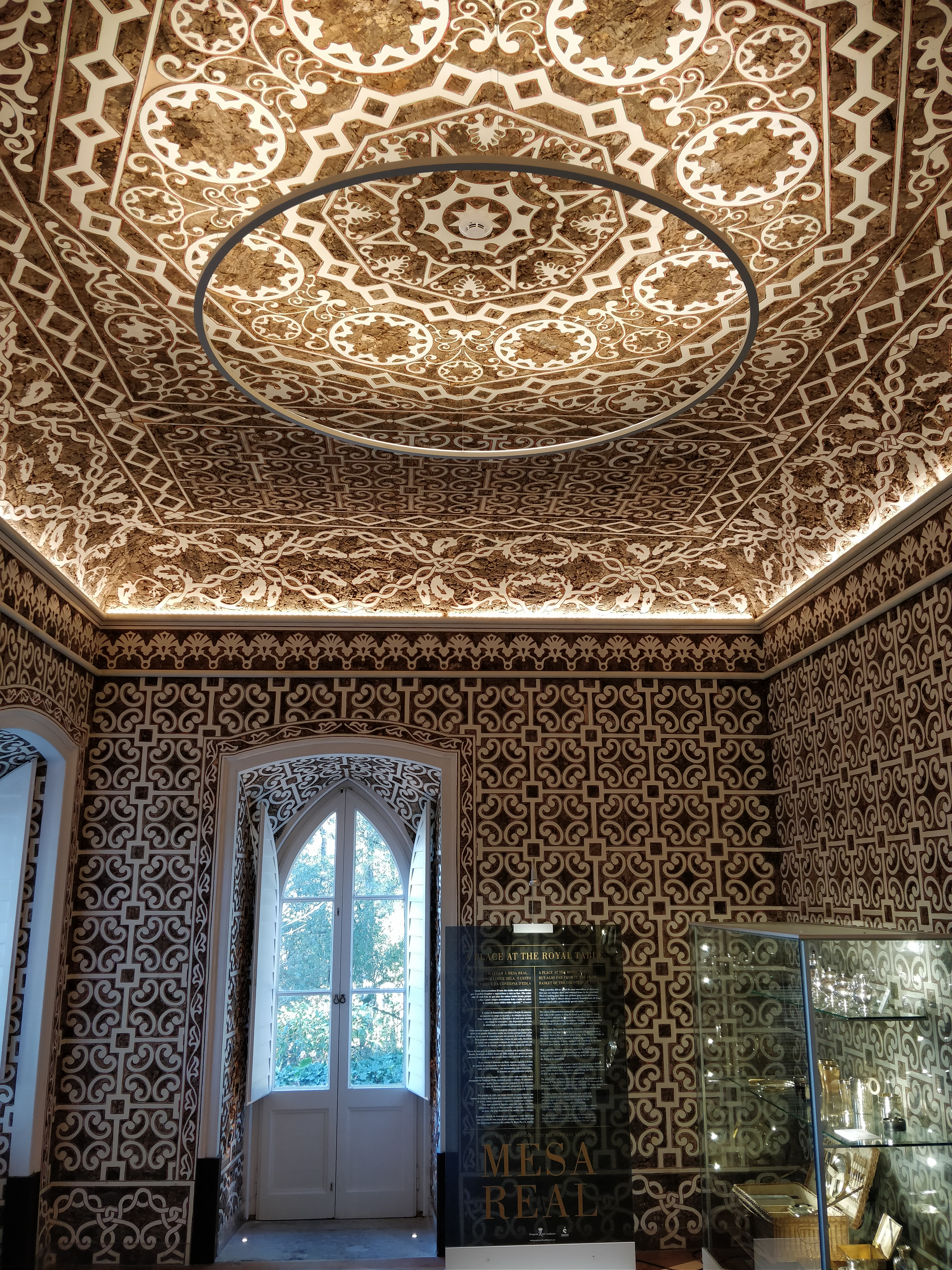
The restored dining room with cork-inlaid walls

== Restoration ==
Following the purchase by the government the chalet gradually went into decline. Following a fire in 1999 that partially destroyed it, reconstruction, supported by EEA and Norway Grants, was undertaken from 2007 in order to return the building to its original state. The building and garden were reopened to the public in 2011. In 2012 the restoration project received a Portuguese Tourism Award, as well as the Grémio Literário Award. In 2013 it was also awarded the European Union Prize for Cultural Heritage in the "Conservation" category. The Chalet now looks just as it did at the time it was built. It is a brick construction covered in plaster and painted to resemble wooden planks. The windows, balconies, handrails, are decorated with cork. Inside, the restoration team went to considerable lengths, with very little information to go on, to identify the use of the various rooms and to reconstitute the decorative elements painted on the walls.
