= Ulnowo, Iława County =

Ulnowo
- Village
- Location within Poland
- Coordinates: 53°41′N 19°23′E
- Country: Poland
- Voivodeship: Warmian-Masurian
- County: Iława
- Gmina: Susz
- Population: 120
- Time zone: UTC+1 (CET)
  - Summer (DST): UTC+2 (CEST)

Ulnowo [ulˈnɔvɔ] is a village in the administrative district of Gmina Susz, within Iława County, Warmian-Masurian Voivodeship, in northern Poland.

== Notable residents ==
- Hans Adolf Erdmann von Auerswald (1792–1848), German politician
