= Elise, Countess of Edla =

American soprano (1836–1929)

Elise Friedericke Hensler
- Countess of Edla
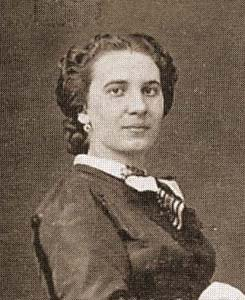
- Born: Elise Friedericke Hensler; 22 May 1836; La Chaux-de-Fonds, Switzerland
- Died: 21 May 1929 (aged 92); Lisbon, Portugal
- Spouse: Ferdinand II of Portugal (m. 1869; died 1885)
- Issue: Alice Hensler
- Father: Johann Friederich Conrad Hensler
- Mother: Louise Josephe Hechelbacher

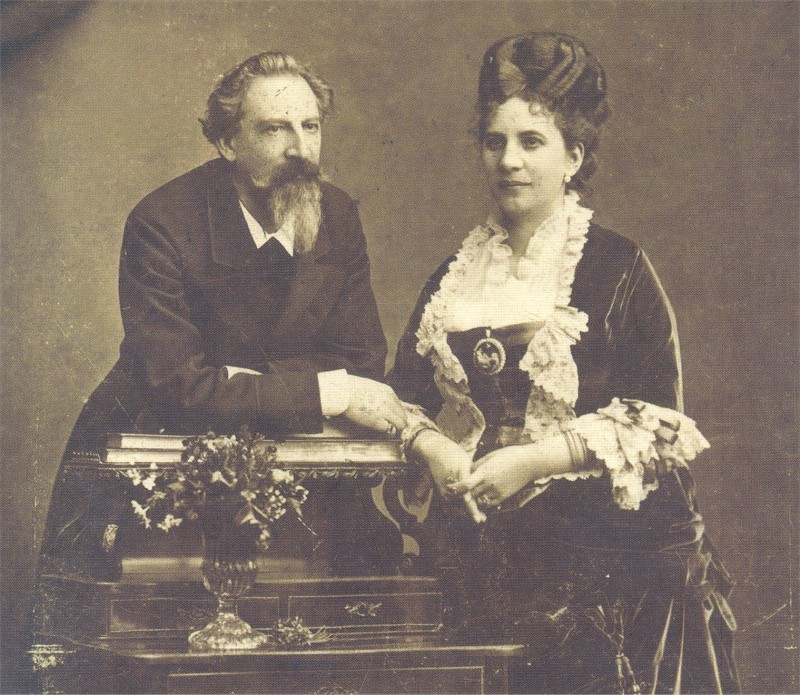
King Ferdinand II and the Countess of Edla, c. 1882

Elise, Countess of Edla (born Elise Friederike Hensler; 22 May 1836 – 21 May 1929) was a Swiss-born soprano who spent most of her life in Portugal, where she became the morganatic second wife of the former King Ferdinand II of Portugal.

== Early life ==
Elise was born on 22 May 1836 at La Chaux-de-Fonds, in the Neuchâtel canton of Switzerland. She was the daughter of Johann Friederich Conrad Hensler and his wife, Louise Josephe Hechelbacher. Her family was Swiss-German. When she was twelve, her family moved to Boston in the United States, where she was given a remarkable education, with the arts and languages playing an important role. She finished her studies in Paris and, as an adult, could easily speak seven languages.

== Musical career ==
Following her studies, Elise joined the La Scala theatre of Milan with an easygoing life. In 1855, when she was nineteen, she had a daughter, Alice Hensler, by an unknown father. The father was a member of the Milanese nobility. Alice Hensler later married a Portuguese officer, Manuel de Azevedo Gomes (1847–1907).

On 2 February 1860, Elise arrived in Portugal and sang at the São João National Theatre in Porto and then at the Teatro Nacional de São Carlos in Lisbon, where she performed in Giuseppe Verdi's opera Un ballo in maschera. On 15 April 1860, Ferdinand II of Portugal, widower of Queen Maria II, attended the opera and was seduced by Elise's voice and beauty; she was then 24 years old. Their relationship deepened rapidly because, just like Ferdinand II, the singer had a passion for sculpture, ceramics, painting, architecture and gardening.

== Marriage ==
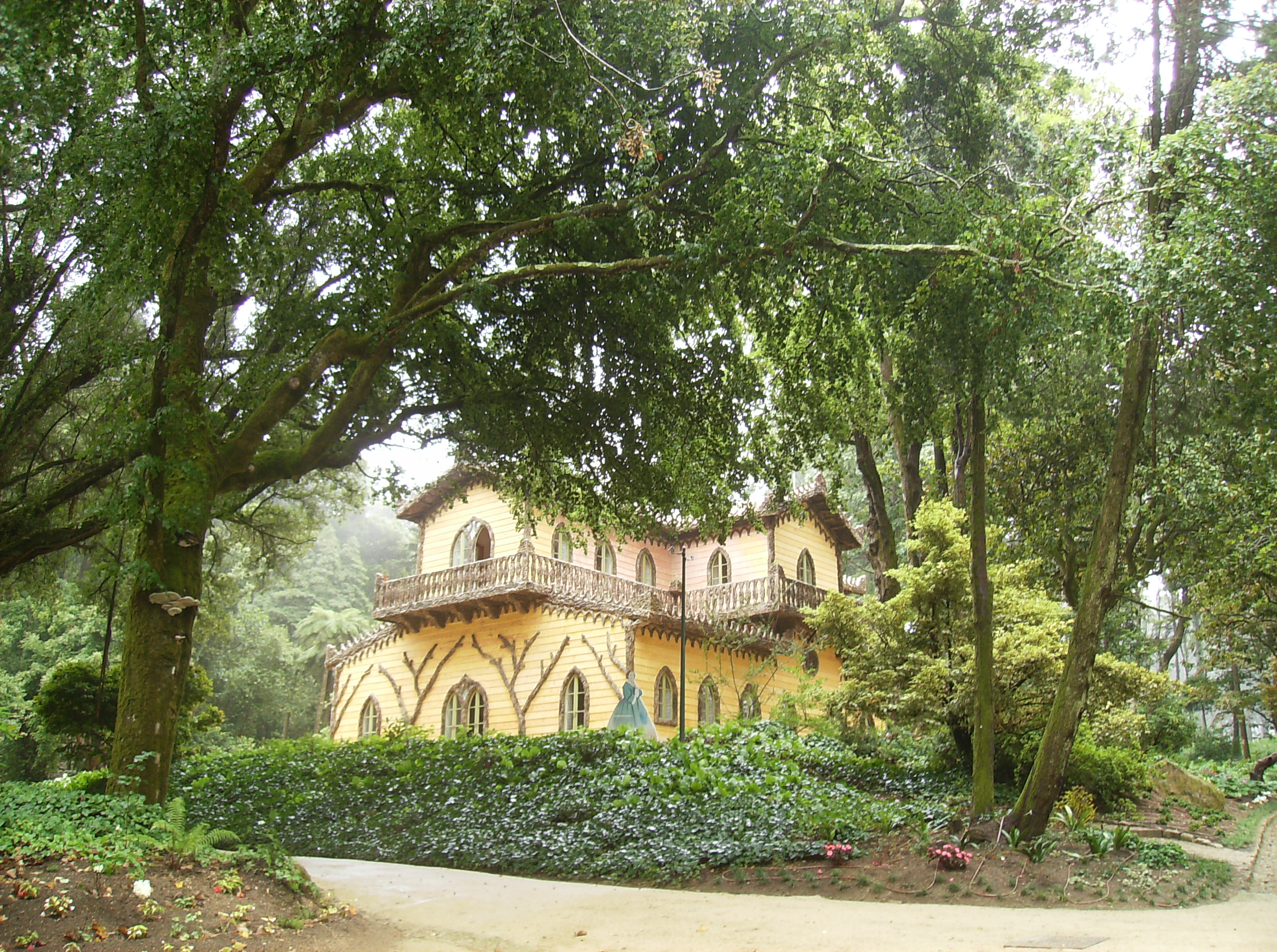
Chalet of the Countess of Edla in Sintra

On 10 June 1869, Elise married morganatically, in Benfica (Lisbon), the former King Ferdinand II of Portugal, Prince of Saxe-Coburg and Gotha. Just before the ceremony, Ernest II, Duke of Saxe-Coburg and Gotha, a cousin of Ferdinand and the head of the House of Saxe-Coburg and Gotha, granted to Elise the title of Gräfin von Edla (Countess of Edla); the marriage was childless.

In Portugal, the couple lived a discreet life in Sintra, where the former king occupied the Palácio da Pena. As a hobby, both Ferdinand and Elise loved botany, and in the middle of their park, Elise built a chalet which she designed herself, inspired by Swiss chalets and rural houses of the United States. With the support of his cultivated wife, Ferdinand supported several artists, including the painter Columbano Bordalo Pinheiro and the pianist José Viana da Mota.

== Later years ==
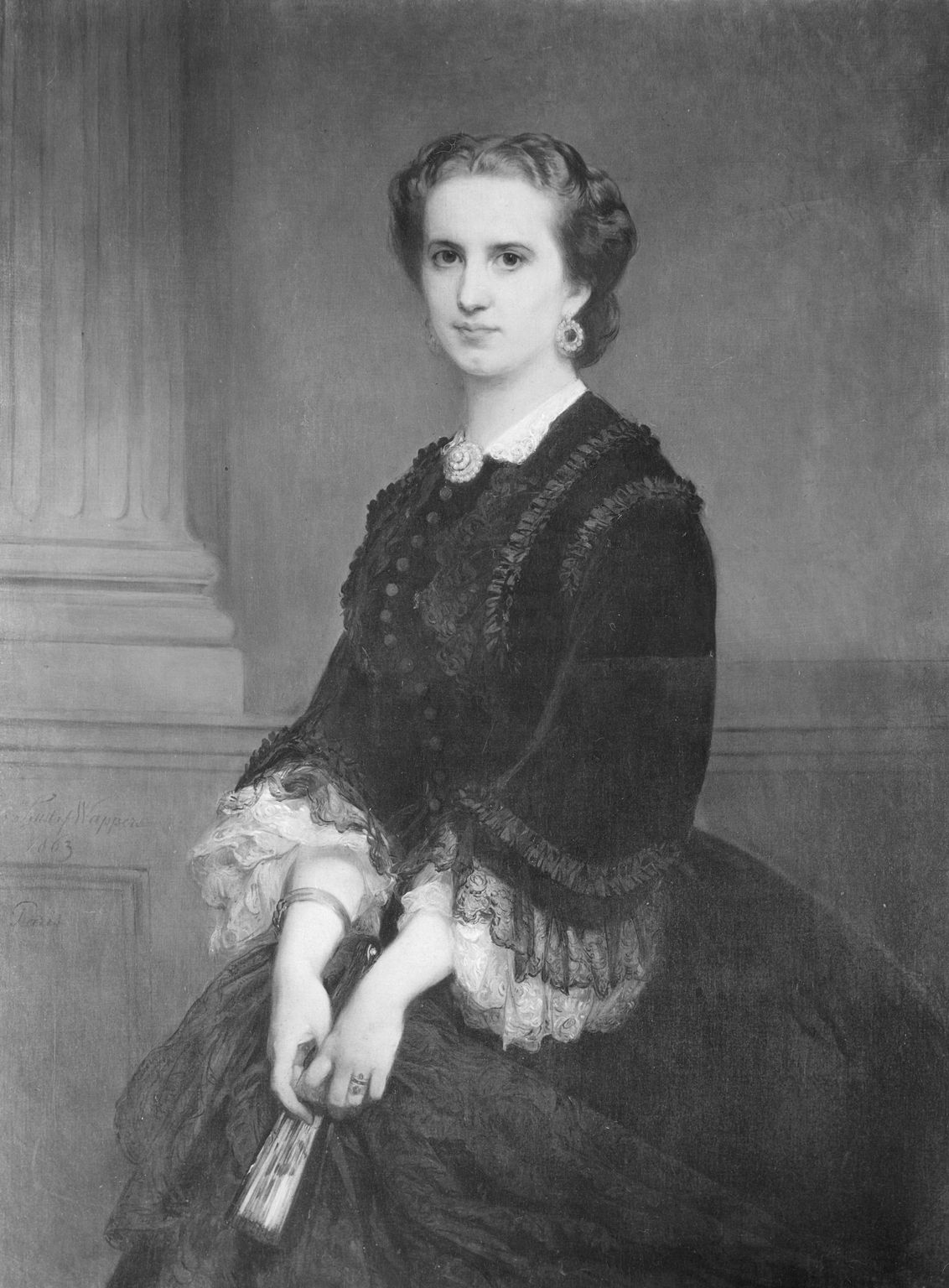
Portrait by Gustave Wappers

In 1885, Ferdinand died and in his will left all his households to the Countess, including the Palácio da Pena. In order for the Countess to maintain these estates, King Charles I of Portugal had to pay her the amount of 410 million réis. As a widow, Elise abandoned Sintra and settled with her daughter Alice and her daughter's husband, Manuel de Azevedo Gomes. She died of uremia on 21 May 1929 in Lisbon, Portugal. During her life, she lived during the reign of 5 Portuguese monarchs: her future husband's first wife Maria II until 1853; her late stepson Pedro V until 1861; her stepson Luís I until 1889; her step-grandson Carlos I until 1908 and her step-great-grandson Manuel II from 1908 to 1910. At her funeral, the dowager queen Amélie of Orléans and the ex-king Manuel II of Portugal, were represented by the Viscount of Asseca.

== Bibliography ==
- "Condessa d'Edla", by Teresa Rebelo. Published in Portuguese by Aletheia Editores, February 2006; ISBN 989-622-031-X
