= Grémio Literário (Lisbon) =

Literary club in Portugal

Coordinates: 38°42′36″N 9°08′24″W

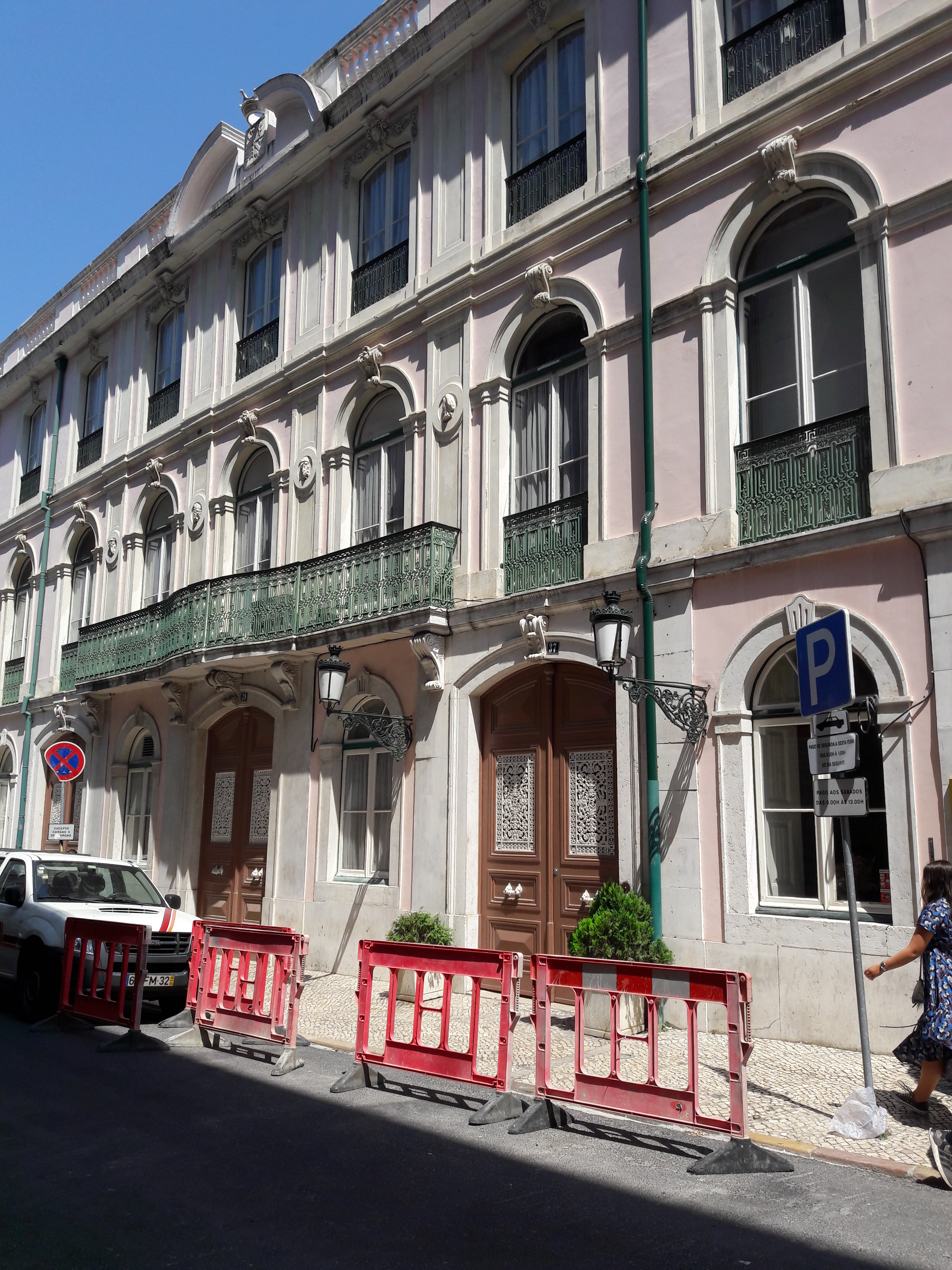
The headquarters of the Grémio Literário

The Grémio Literário (Literary Guild) is a private club in Lisbon, Portugal that was founded in 1846 for the purpose of intellectual and literary discussion. It is now also used for private and corporate events. It is housed in the Palacete de Loures in the Chiado area of Lisbon.

== History ==
The club was founded by royal charter from Maria II of Portugal and her husband Ferdinand II on April 18, 1846. Part of the charter states:

…Considering that the purpose of this association is the culture of letters, and that through intellectual illustration it can contribute to moral improvement...

The main founders were the historian Alexandre Herculano (member no. 1) and the poet and playwright Almeida Garrett. Others involved were the novelist Luís Augusto Rebelo da Silva, the playwright José da Silva Mendes Leal and leading supporters of the Liberal cause during the Portuguese civil war, which had ended a decade before its foundation, such as Rodrigo da Fonseca Magalhães, Fontes Pereira de Melo, António Rodrigues Sampaio, Sá da Bandeira, and Anselmo José Braamcamp.

In its first years, the Grémio had several headquarters, always in the Chiado area, including Palácio Quintela. Finally, in 1875, it settled in the mansion of the Viscount of Loures, on Rua de S. Francisco (now Rua Ivens). This is a fine example of the architecture of Portuguese Romanticism. The interior has an eclectic range of artistic styles, including a variety of textile coverings on the ground floor; the Green Room with an imperial style; a Victorian bar; a smoking room with carved wooden panelling; and a room in a neo-Louis XV style.

== Activities ==
In the first decades of its existence, the Grémio carried out a series of intense intellectual activities, with conferences and courses covering different areas of knowledge, taught by renowned experts at the time. Topics covered included hygiene, philosophy, literature, history, fine arts, astronomy and agriculture. Mentions of the Grémio Literário are frequent in Portuguese nineteenth-century literature, including in works by authors such as Francisco Teixeira de Queiroz, Abel Botelho, and Ramalho Ortigão. In his novel Os Maias, Eça de Queiroz locates several scenes in the Grémio building, which, in the novel, is next door to the building where the character Maria Eduarda lives.

The first modernist exhibition in Portugal took place in 1912 in the Grémio. This was the first time that the artist Almada Negreiros exhibited. The overthrow of the Portuguese monarchy and the establishment of the First Portuguese Republic in 1910 slowed down the activity of the guild until the 1950s. From the 1960s, it redeveloped its cultural and social role and in 1969 the Grémio Literário Award was given for the first time. The award is intended to "annually distinguish original cultural works by Portuguese authors published or produced during the previous calendar year, in the fields of letters, arts and sciences". The Grémio has an extensive library.

== Recognition ==
On 24 January 1996, the Grémio Literário was made an honorary member of the Military Order of Saint James of the Sword, to mark its 150th anniversary. On 17 April 2021, as part of the celebration of its 175th anniversary, it was made an honorary member of the Order of Prince Henry. At that time, two Portuguese postage stamps were also issued featuring the Grémio.

In 2018 the Palacete de Loures, including its garden and contents, was classified by the Ministry of Culture, as a “monument of public interest". In the same year, Grémio Literário was recognized by the Lisbon City Council as an entity of "local historical and cultural interest".

== Visits ==
Entrance to the building is limited to members and their guests. Membership is no longer limited to supporters of one particular faction and its openness to people of all political views is considered by some to be one reason for its longevity. Founded as a gentlemen's club, it is now open to female members, although in 2000 only 80 of the 1200 members were women. The Grémio is also available for corporate events. Casual visitors are not catered for.
