= Hans Adolf Erdmann von Auerswald =

Prussian general and politician

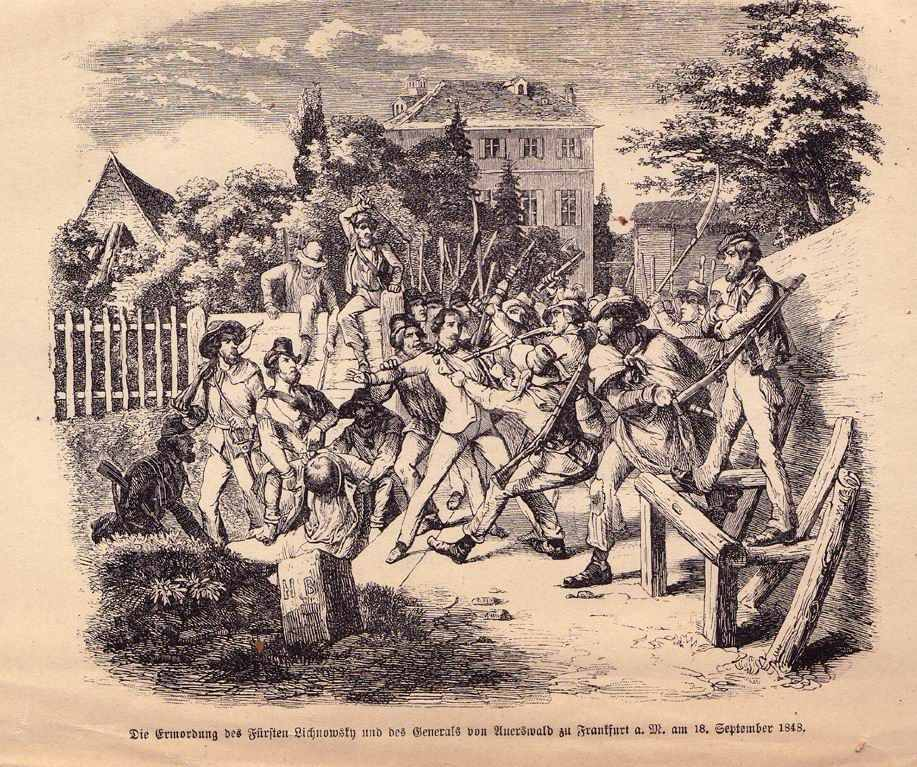
Drawing of the murder of Prince Lichnowsky and General von Auerswald

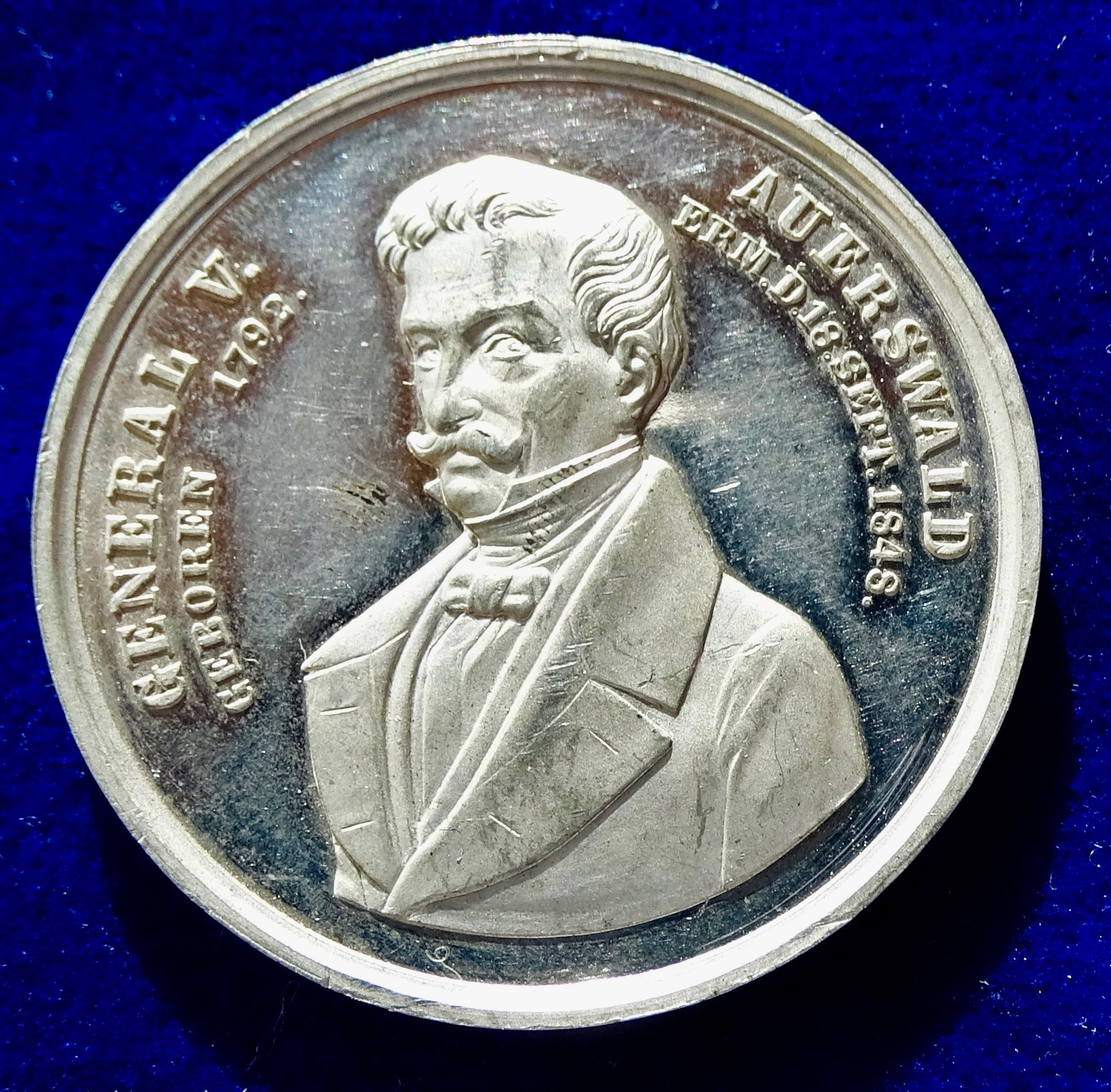
Frankfurt am Main, German Revolution Medal 1848 General Hans von Auerswald, obverse

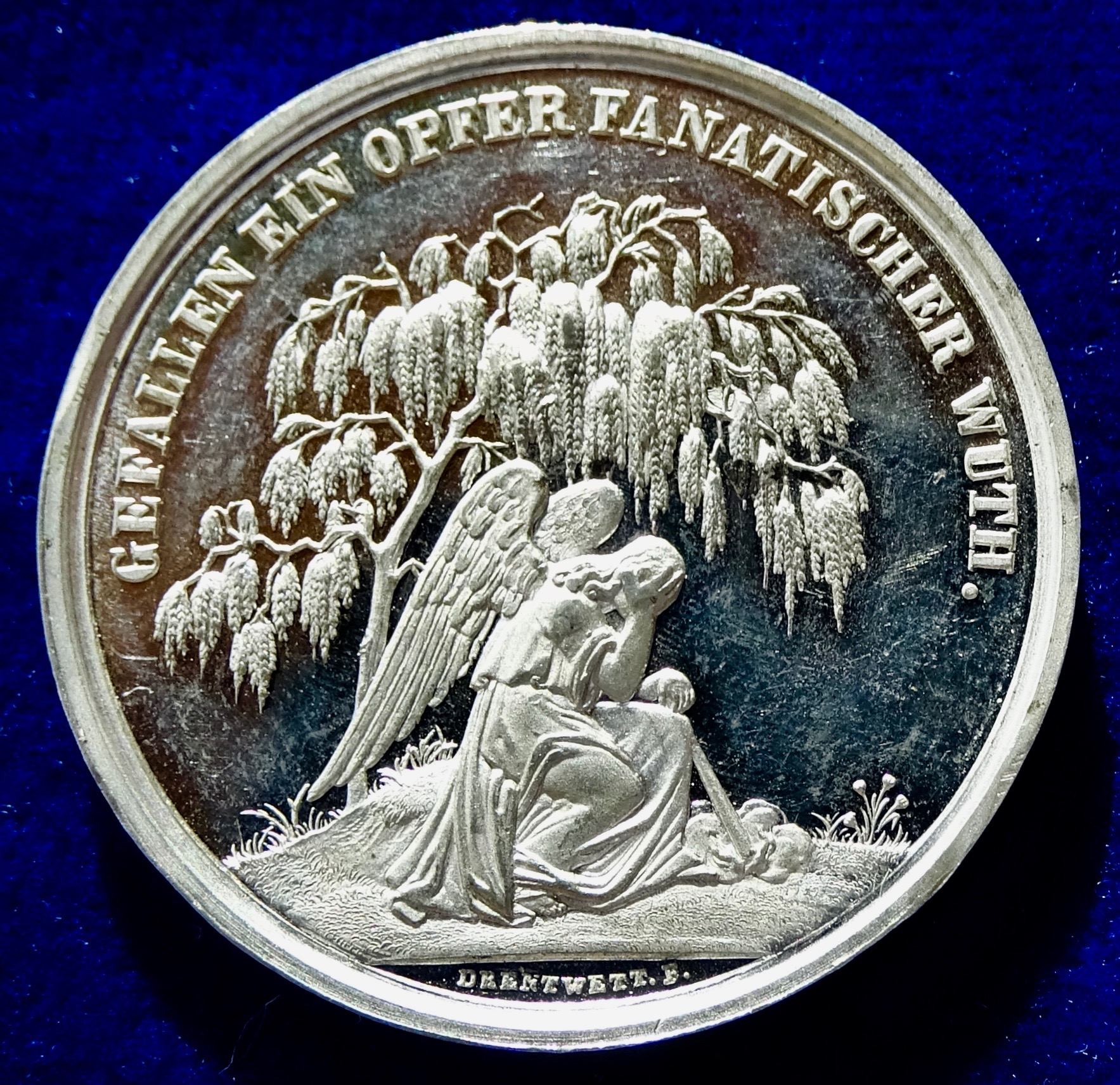
The reverse of this medal.

Hans Adolf Erdmann von Auerswald (1792 – September 18, 1848) was a Prussian general and politician.

== Biography ==
Auerswald was born in Faulen, West Prussia where the family possessed the estates of Plauth and Tromnau.

He entered the Prussian army in 1813 and by 1848 had become a major general. Three precincts had elected him to the Frankfurt parliament where he joined the conservatives, but he did not participate in the party leadership or the debates. On September 17, 1848, a gathering on the Pfingstweide in Frankfurt led by Franz Zitz had, on account of the parliament's decision regarding the truce of Malmö, declared the members thereof traitors to the fatherland, freedom and honor. The result was the uprising on the next day where a mob went looking for Reichsminister Hekscher and Prince Felix Lichnowsky. Auerswald had ridden out with Lichnowsky, and by the Friedberger Gate, the mob discovered them. They tried to flee. At the Bethmann villa, Auerswald was killed by a pistol shot.
