= Felix Lichnowsky =

Austrian politician

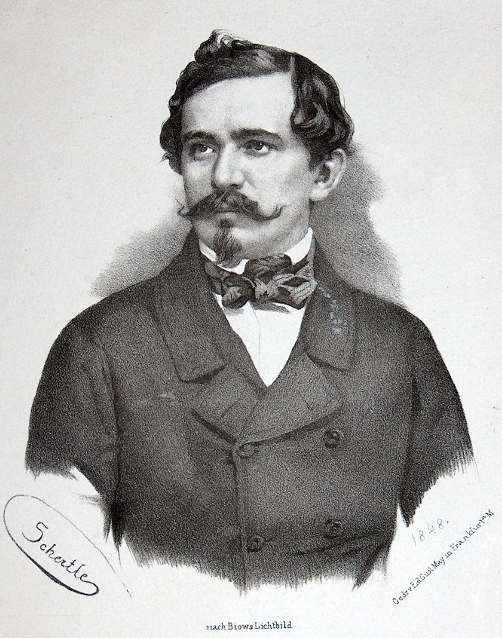
Felix Lichnowsky

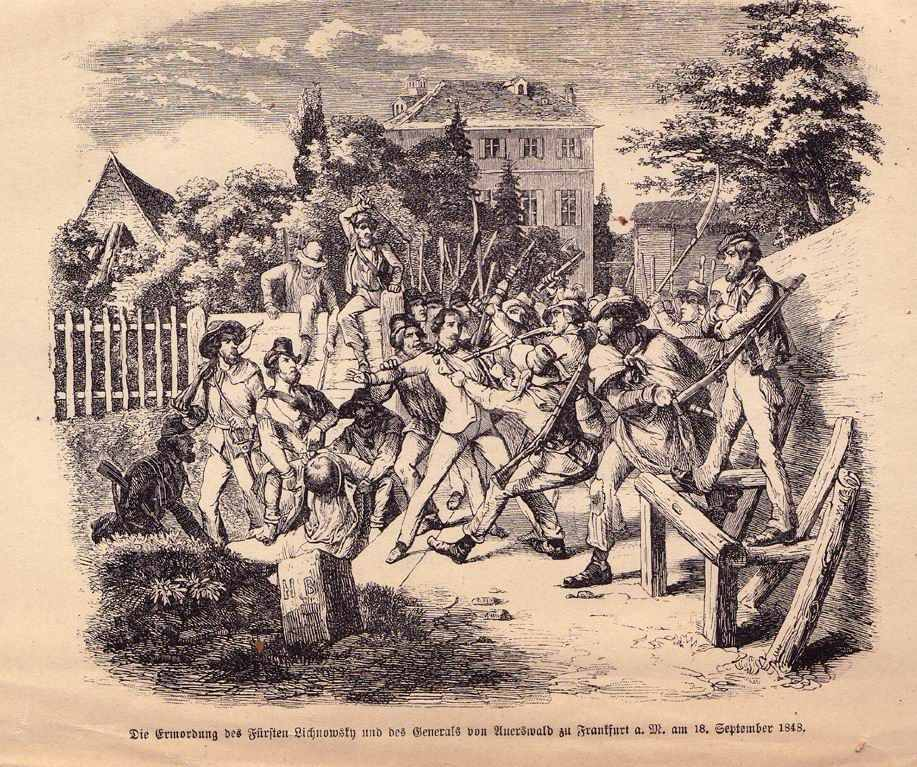
Drawing of the murder of Prince Lichnowsky and General von Auerswald

Felix (von) Lichnowsky, fully Felix Maria Vincenz Andreas Fürst von Lichnowsky, Graf von Werdenberg (Spanish: Félix Lichnowsky; 5 April 1814 – 19 September 1848) was a son of the historian Eduard Lichnowsky who had written a history of the Habsburg family.

Lichnowsky was born in Vienna. He entered the Prussian army in 1834 in Neustadt (now Prudnik), but left it in 1838 to enter the service of the Spanish pretender Don Carlos, where he received the rank of brigadier general. He fought a duel with the Spanish General Montenegro and was severely wounded, but recovered. In 1847, he was elected by Ratibor (now Racibórz) to Prussia's United Diet, and was elected to the national parliament in 1848 where he took his seat on the right. Here he put to use his substantial oratorical skills, though frequently using them to dazzle rather than enlighten, and his demeaning characterizations of the left earned him a poor reputation in those quarters. When the uprising broke out on 18 September in consequence of the parliament's decision regarding the truce of Malmö (in the debate for which Lichnowsky had spoken in very conciliatory terms), disdaining all warnings, he rode out with General von Auerswald to meet the troops arriving from Württemberg. A group of upset citizens recognized them on the Bornheimer Highway and chased them. Von Auerswald was shot to death and Lichnowsky beaten up and died the next day in Baron Bethmann's villa in Frankfurt. He is buried in Krzyżanowice, Silesian Voivodeship.

== Literature ==
- Felix Lichnowsky: Erinnerungen aus den Jahren 1837, 1838 und 1839, 2 Bände, Frankfurt am Main, 1841
- Felix Lichnowsky: Portugal. Erinnerungen aus dem Jahre 1842, Mainz, 1843 (first edition)
- A. Loning: Das spanische Volk in seinen Ständen, Sitten und Gebräuchen mit Episoden aus dem Karlistischen Erbfolgekriege. Hannover 1844.
- August Karl von Goeben: Vier Jahre in Spanien. Hannover 1841
- Wilhelm Baron von Rahden: Aus Spaniens Bürgerkrieg 1833-1840. Berlin, 1851
- Antonio Pirala: Historia de la guerra civil y de los partidos liberal y carlista. Segunda edición. Madrid 1868-1871
- Roland Hoede: Die Paulskirche als Symbol. Freimaurer in ihrem Wirken um Einheit und Freiheit 1822-1999. Bayreuth und Frankfurt 1999, S. 94f.
- Georg Weerth: Leben und Taten des berühmten Ritters Schnapphahnski. Fortsetzungsroman in der Neuen Rheinischen Zeitung, Köln, August 1848 - Januar 1849
- Dušan Uhlíř: Slezský šlechtic Felix Lichnovský. Poslední láska kněžny Zaháňské. Verl. Paseka, Prag 2009.
- Martin Herzig: Geliebt - gehasst - gelyncht, Leben und Tod des Fürsten Felix von Lichnowsky. Nora Verlag, Berlin 2012
- Raül Garrigasait: Els Estranys. Mirmanda. Edicions de 1984, Barcelona 2017
