= Francisco Teixeira de Queiroz =

Portuguese writer (1848–1919)

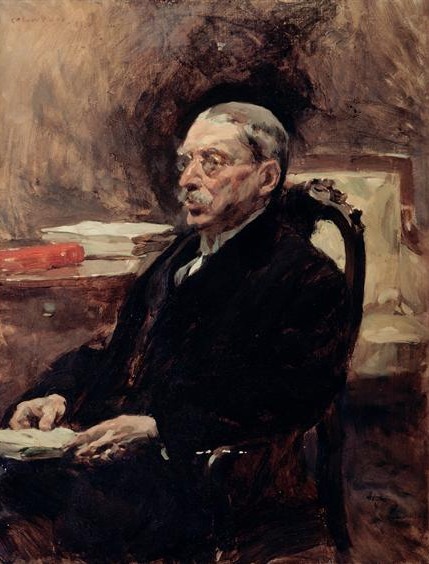
Francisco Teixeira de Queirós (1848–1919), a Portuguese writer.

Francisco Teixeira de Queiroz (May 3, 1848 - July 22, 1919), who used the pen name of Bento Moreno, was a Portuguese writer.

== Biography ==
Francisco Teixeira de Queiroz was born in 1848 to José Maria Teixeira de Queiroz and Antónia Joaquina Pereira Machado, in Arcos de Valdevez, a small town at the northern tip of Portugal. He graduated in medicine from the University of Coimbra.

He was a vereador (alderman) in Lisbon around 1885 and a deputy in the legislature in 1893. He joined the Constituent Cortes in 1911 as a deputy for the circle of Aldeia Galega (now the city of Montijo), and resigned the position in the same year. He additionally served as Minister of Foreign Affairs in the first government headed by José de Castro in 1915. During that same year, he was also president of the Academy of Sciences of Lisbon.

He was married to Teresa Narcisa de Oliveira David, and had six children.

Teixeira de Queiroz died in Sintra in 1919.

== Work ==
As a novelist and short story writer, he was a faithful follower of the naturalist and realist schools prevalent at the time.

At the very outset of his literary career, while he was still a student, he initiated two parallel series of short stories and novels. These were titled Rural Comedy and Bourgeois Comedy, and are considered his most significant works. His choice of this model was inspired by Balzac, whose influence is also evident in the series' content and their predominantly realist and naturalist style.

Antonio Jose Saraiva and Oscar Lopes, in their History of Portuguese Literature, compared his talent to that of José Maria de Eça de Queiroz, widely considered one of the greatest Portuguese writers.

== Bibliography ==
Rural Comedy series

- "My First Short Story" (1876)
- "Divine Love" (1877)
- "Antonio Fogueira" (1882)
- "New Tales" (1887)
- "Love, Love..." (1897)
- "Our People" (1899)
- "The Singer" (1913)
- "To the Sun and Rain" (1915)

Bourgeois Comedy series

- "The Betrothed" (1879)
- "Salústio Nogueira" (1883)
- "D. Agostinho" (1894)
- "Death of D. Agustinho" (1895)
- "The Famous Galrão" (1898)
- "Charity in Lisbon" (1901)
- "Love Letters" (1906)
- "The Great Chimera" (1919)

Outside of these two series, Teixeira de Queiroz also published:

- The Great Man (drama, 1891)
- Groves (stories, 1895).
