= Lubnowy =

Lubnowy is part of the name of two villages, both located in Gmina Susz, within Iława County, Warmian-Masurian Voivodeship, Poland:

- Lubnowy Małe
- Lubnowy Wielkie

== See also ==
- Liebenau
