= Iławka =

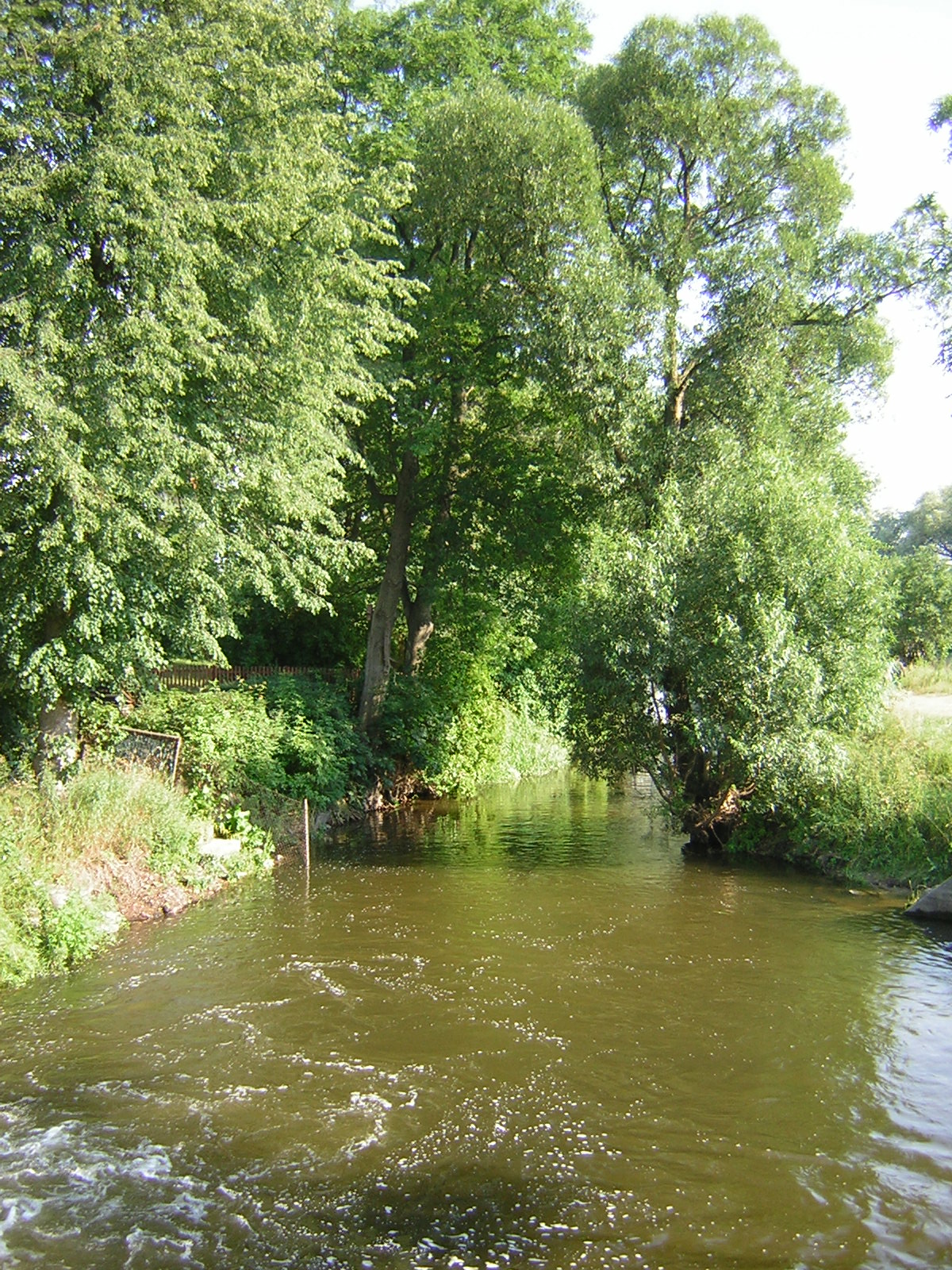
- River Iławka in Iława

- Location of the mouth in Poland

Location
- Country: Poland

Physical characteristics
- Source
  - location: Jeziorak
  - coordinates: 53.6002°N 19.5606°E
  - elevation: 99.4 m
- Mouth
  - location: Drwęca
  - coordinates: 53°31′48″N 19°41′01″E
- Length: 46.31 km (28.78 mi)

Basin features
- Progression: Drwęca→ Vistula→ Baltic Sea

Iławka is a small river in Poland, in Warmian-Masurian Voivodeship, a tributary of the Drwęca river. It flows out of lake Jeziorak in the town of Iława, crosses lake Iławskie, and flows past the villages of Dziarny, Kozianka and Dziarnówko.

Historically, it was known in Polish as both Iławka and Iława.
