= Makowo =

Makowo may refer to the following places:

== Bulgaria ==
- Makowo, Bulgaria, a village in northeastern Bulgaria

== Poland ==
- Makowo, Podlaskie Voivodeship (north-east Poland)
- Makowo, Warmian-Masurian Voivodeship (north Poland)
- Mąkowo, Pomeranian Voivodeship (north Poland)

== Tanzania ==
- Makowo, Morogoro, a village in Morogoro Region, Tanzania
- Makowo, Njombe, a ward in Njombe Region, Tanzania

== See also ==
- Makovo (disambiguation)
