= Jawty =

Jawty (German: Jauth) is part of the name of two villages, both located in Gmina Susz, within Iława County, Warmian-Masurian Voivodeship, Poland:

- Lubnowy Małe
- Lubnowy Wielkie
