= Tynwald (disambiguation) =

Tynwald is the legislature of the Isle of Man.

Tynwald may also refer to:

- Tynwałd, a village in Iława County, Warmian-Masurian Voivodeship, northern Poland
- Tynwald Day, the national day of the Isle of Man
- SS Tynwald, several ships
- Tynwald South, a suburb of Harare, Zimbabwe

== See also ==
- Act of Tynwald, a statute passed by Tynwald
- Douglas Tynwald Kelly (1920-2006), Canadian politician
- Tinwald (disambiguation)
