= Emilianowo =

Emilianowo may refer to the following places:

- Emilianowo, Greater Poland Voivodeship (west-central Poland)
- Emilianowo, Kuyavian-Pomeranian Voivodeship (north-central Poland)
- Emilianowo, Gmina Iława in Warmian-Masurian Voivodeship (north Poland)
- Emilianowo, Gmina Susz in Warmian-Masurian Voivodeship (north Poland)
- Emilianowo, West Pomeranian Voivodeship (north-west Poland)
