= Mózgowo =

- Village
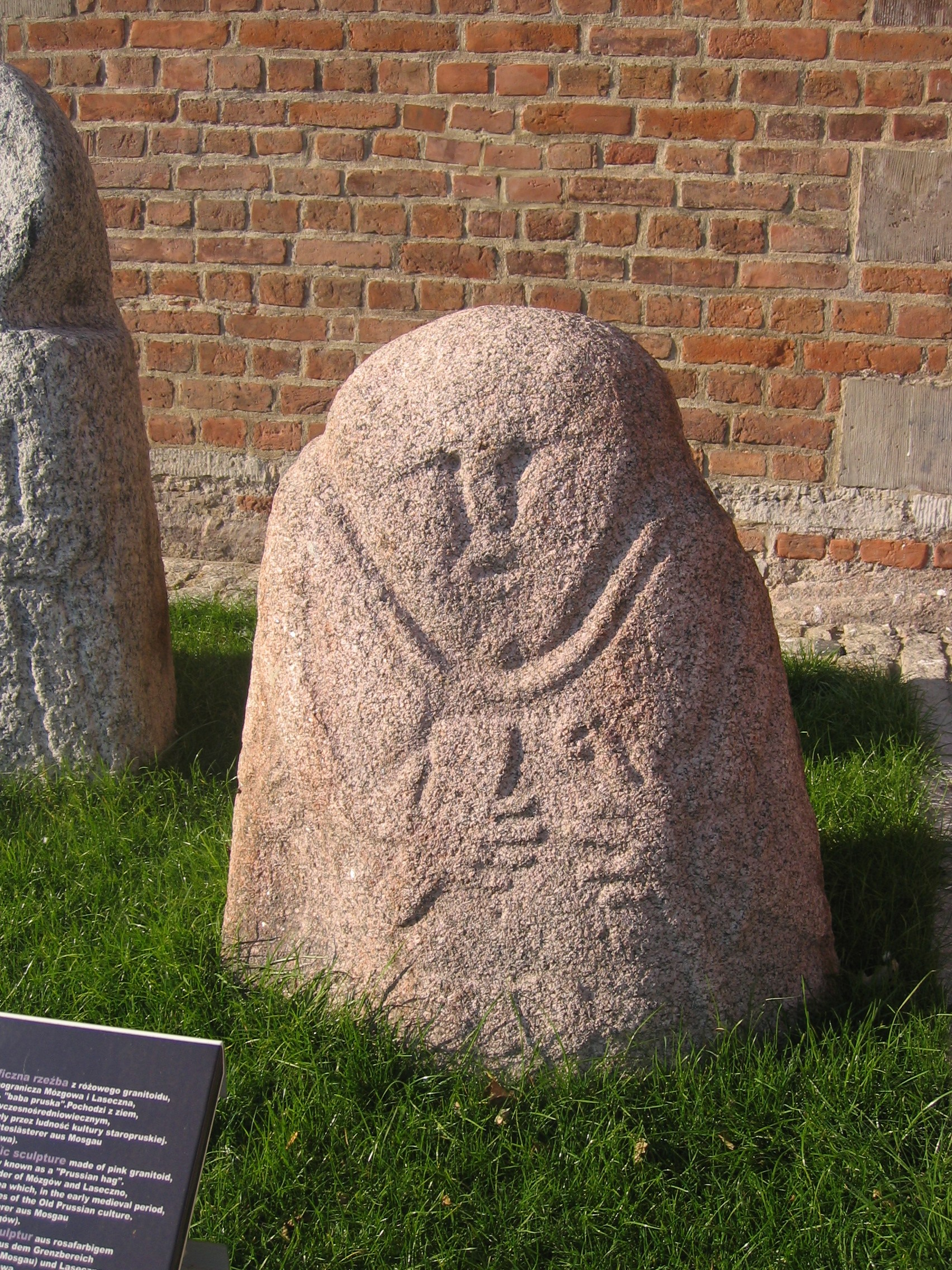
- Medieval sculpture, so-called "stone baba", used to stand on the border of Mózgowo and Laseczno. Today in Gdańsk, Muzeum Archeologiczne

- Location within Poland
- Coordinates: 53°36′N 19°24′E
- Country: Poland
- Voivodeship: Warmian-Masurian
- County: Iława
- Gmina: Iława
- Population (2021): 240

Mózgowo [muzˈɡɔvɔ] is a village in the administrative district of Gmina Iława, within Iława County, Warmian-Masurian Voivodeship, in northern Poland.
