= Babięty Wielkie, Warmian-Masurian Voivodeship =

Babięty Wielkie
- Village
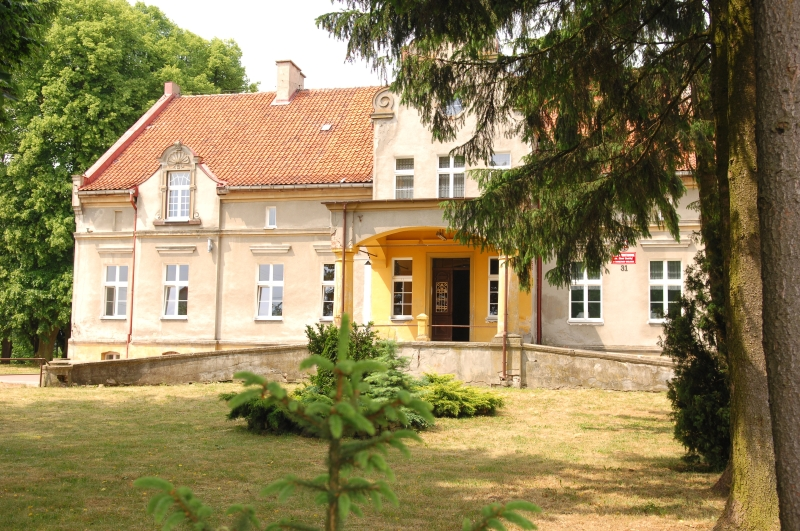
- The neo-baroque palace in Babięty Wielkie, now a primary school

- Location within Poland
- Coordinates: 53°39′40″N 19°24′5″E
- Country: Poland
- Voivodeship: Warmian-Masurian
- County: Iława
- Gmina: Susz
- Population: 260
- Time zone: UTC+1 (CET)
  - Summer (DST): UTC+2 (CEST)

Babięty Wielkie [baˈbjɛntɨ ˈvjɛlkʲɛ] is a village in the administrative district of Gmina Susz, within Iława County, Warmian-Masurian Voivodeship, in northern Poland.
