= Franciszkowo, Iława County =

Franciszkowo
- Village
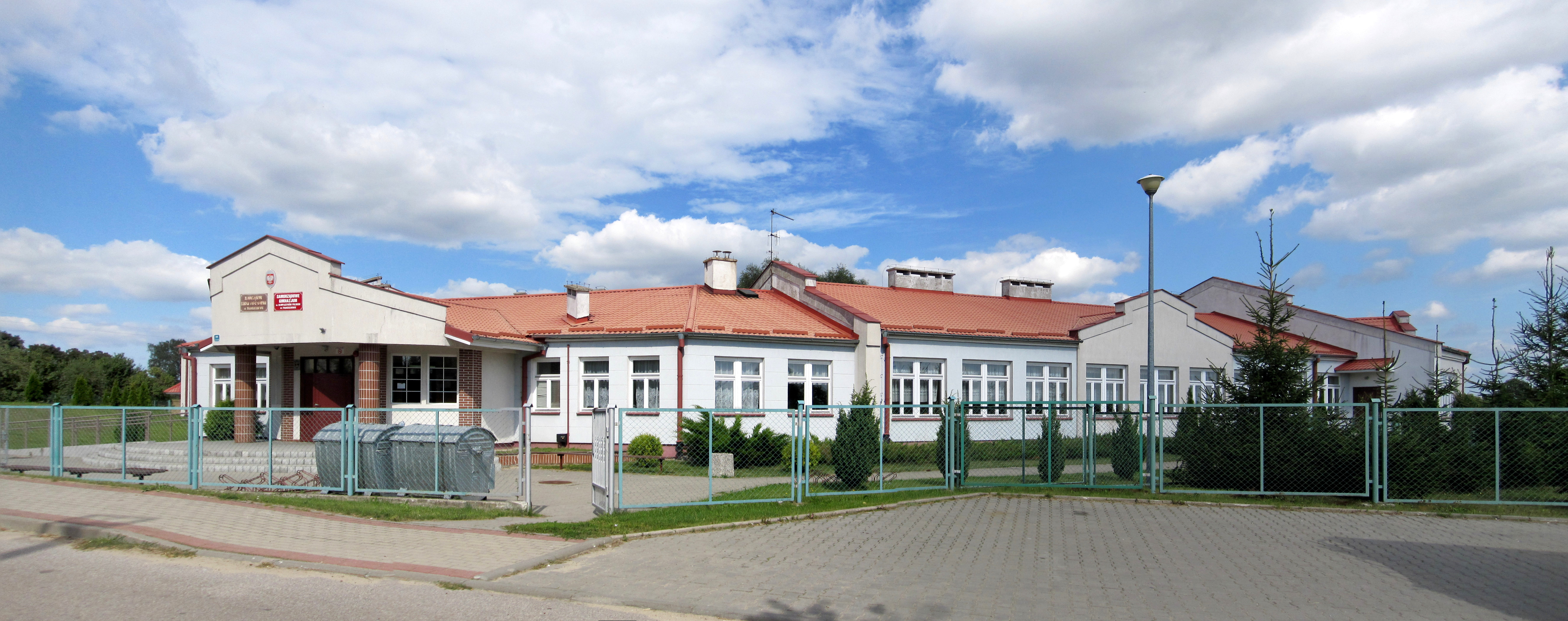
- Franciszkowo - middle school building

- Location within Poland
- Coordinates: 53°38′46″N 19°44′32″E
- Country: Poland
- Voivodeship: Warmian-Masurian
- County: Iława
- Gmina: Iława

Franciszkowo [frant͡ɕiʂˈkɔvɔ] is a village in the administrative district of Gmina Iława. It is within Iława County, Warmian-Masurian Voivodeship, in northern Poland.
