= Radomek, Warmian-Masurian Voivodeship =

Radomek
- Village
- Location within Poland
- Coordinates: 53°34′N 19°32′E
- Country: Poland
- Voivodeship: Warmian-Masurian
- County: Iława
- Gmina: Iława
- Population (approx.): 400

Radomek [raˈdɔmɛk] is a village in the administrative district of Gmina Iława, within Iława County, Warmian-Masurian Voivodeship, in northern Poland.
