= Nowy Ostrów, Warmian-Masurian Voivodeship =

Nowy Ostrów
- Settlement
- Location within Poland
- Coordinates: 53°31′15″N 19°34′12″E
- Country: Poland
- Voivodeship: Warmian-Masurian
- County: Iława
- Gmina: Iława

Nowy Ostrów [ˈnɔvɨ ˈɔstruf] is a settlement in the administrative district of Gmina Iława, within Iława County, Warmian-Masurian Voivodeship, in northern Poland.
