= Katarzynki, Warmian-Masurian Voivodeship =

Katarzynki
- Settlement
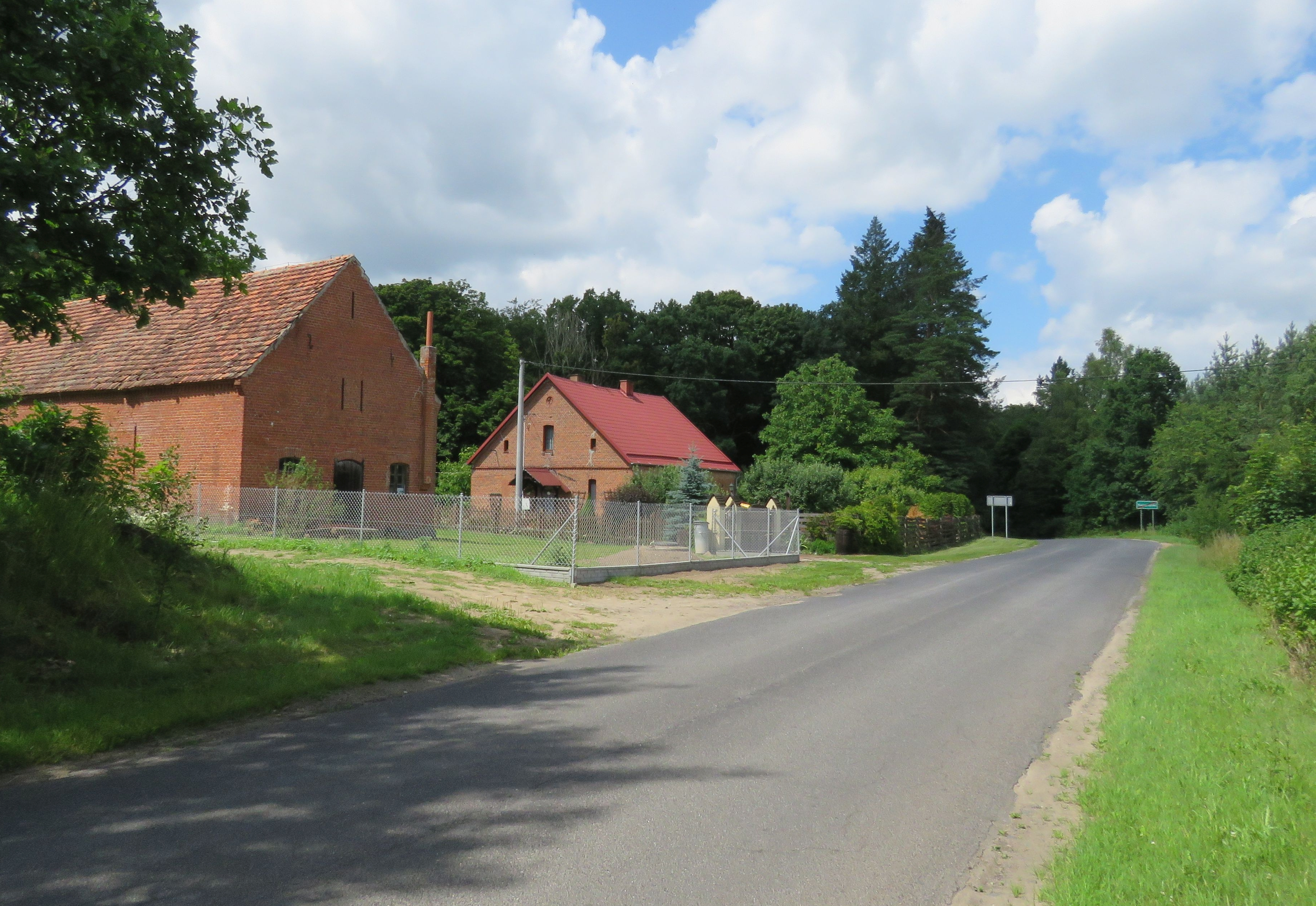
- Roadside houses in Katarzynki

- Location within Poland
- Coordinates: 53°32′09″N 19°33′35″E
- Country: Poland
- Voivodeship: Warmian-Masurian
- County: Iława
- Gmina: Iława
- Population (approx.): 20

Katarzynki [kataˈʐɨnki] is a settlement in the administrative district of Gmina Iława, within Iława County, Warmian-Masurian Voivodeship, in northern Poland.
