= Jakubowo Kisielickie =

- Village
- Location within Poland
- Coordinates: 53°38′47″N 19°21′40″E
- Country: Poland
- Voivodeship: Warmian-Masurian
- County: Iława
- Gmina: Susz
- Population: 180
- Time zone: UTC+1 (CET)
  - Summer (DST): UTC+2 (CEST)

Jakubowo Kisielickie [jakuˈbɔvɔ kiɕɛˈlit͡skʲɛ] is a village in the administrative district of Gmina Susz, within Iława County, Warmian–Masurian Voivodeship, in northern Poland.
