= Szczepkowo, Warmian-Masurian Voivodeship =

Szczepkowo
- Village
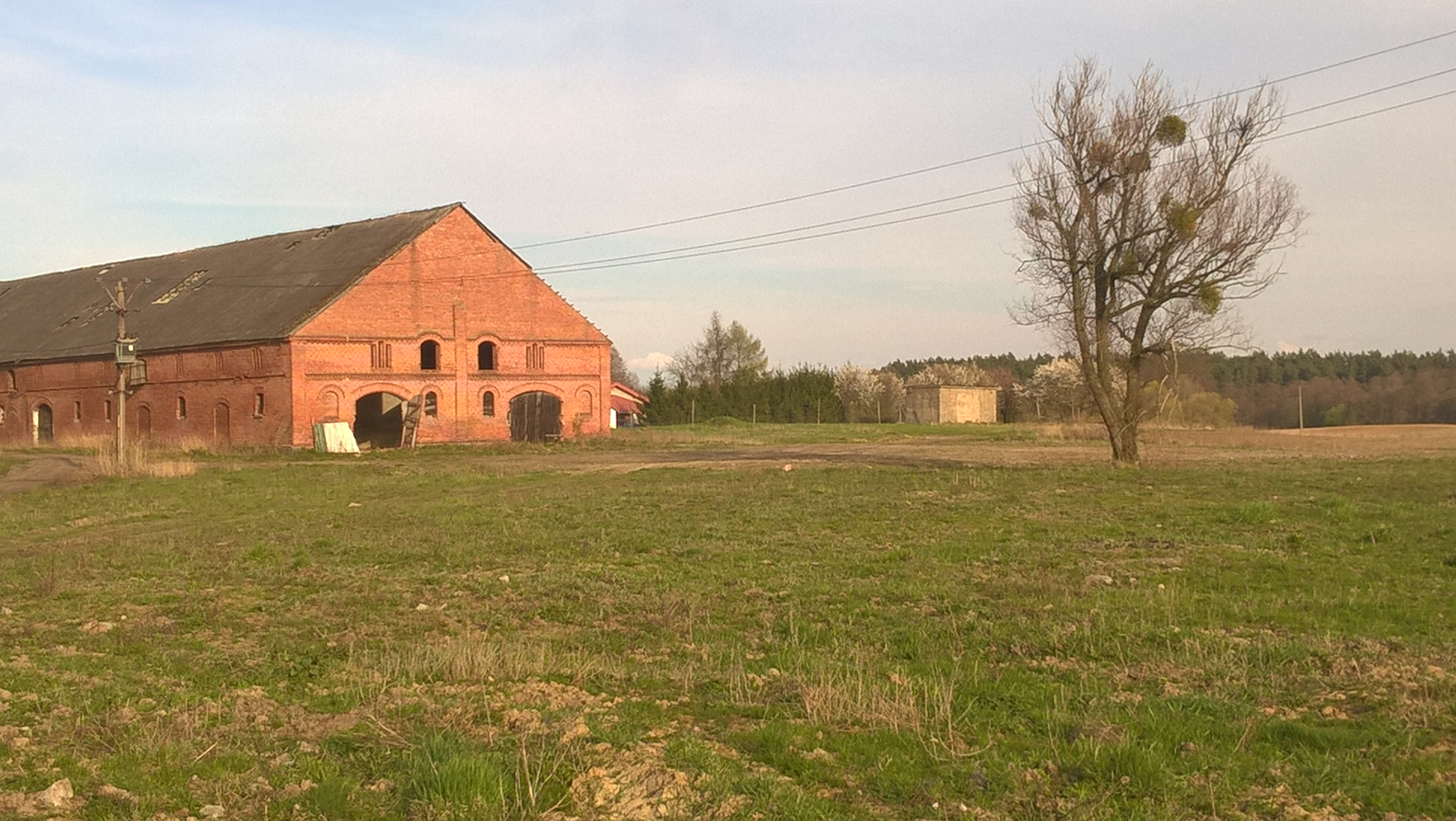

- Location within Poland
- Coordinates: 53°37′31″N 19°30′50″E
- Country: Poland
- Voivodeship: Warmian-Masurian
- County: Iława
- Gmina: Iława

Szczepkowo [ʂt͡ʂɛpˈkɔvɔ] is a village in the administrative district of Gmina Iława, within Iława County, Warmian-Masurian Voivodeship, in northern Poland.
