= Przejazd, Warmian-Masurian Voivodeship =

Przejazd
- Settlement
- Location within Poland
- Coordinates: 53°38′53″N 19°43′03″E
- Country: Poland
- Voivodeship: Warmian-Masurian
- County: Iława
- Gmina: Iława

Przejazd [ˈpʂɛjast] is a village in the administrative district of Gmina Iława, in Iława County, Warmian-Masurian Voivodeship, in northern Poland.
