= Skarszewo, Warmian-Masurian Voivodeship =

Skarszewo
- Village
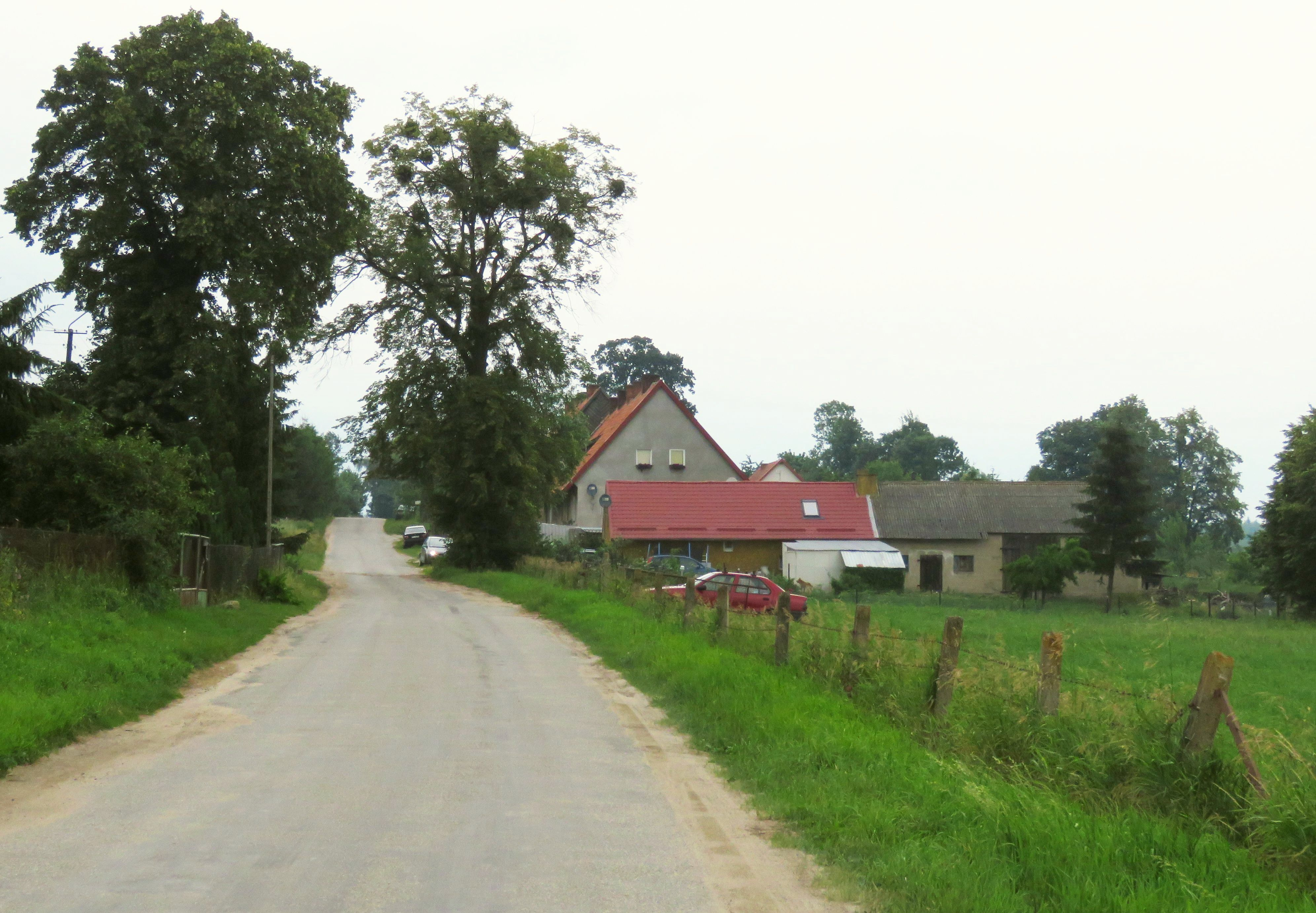

- Location within Poland
- Coordinates: 53°34′18″N 19°27′41″E
- Country: Poland
- Voivodeship: Warmian-Masurian
- County: Iława
- Gmina: Iława
- Time zone: UTC+1 (CET)
  - Summer (DST): UTC+2 (CEST)
- Vehicle registration: NIL

Skarszewo [skarˈʂɛvɔ] is a village in the administrative district of Gmina Iława, within Iława County, Warmian-Masurian Voivodeship, in northern Poland.
