= Zofiówka, Warmian-Masurian Voivodeship =

Zofiówka
- Settlement
- Location within Poland
- Coordinates: 53°41′25″N 19°30′28″E
- Country: Poland
- Voivodeship: Warmian-Masurian
- County: Iława
- Gmina: Susz
- Population: 0
- Time zone: UTC+1 (CET)
  - Summer (DST): UTC+2 (CEST)

Zofiówka [zɔˈfjufka] is a former settlement in the administrative district of Gmina Susz, within Iława County, Warmian-Masurian Voivodeship, in northern Poland.
