= Lisiecki =

Lisiecki (feminine: Lisiecka) is a Polish toponymic surname derived from any of places named Lisiec. Notable people with the surname include:

- Jan Lisiecki (born 1995), Polish-Canadian classical pianist
- Lorraine Lisiecki, American paleoclimatologist
- Paweł Lisiecki (born 1978), Polish politician
- Piotr Lisiecki (born 1993), Polish singer and guitarist
