= Dół =

- Village
- Location within Poland
- Coordinates: 53°35′38″N 19°37′3″E
- Country: Poland
- Voivodeship: Warmian-Masurian
- County: Iława
- Gmina: Iława

Population
  - Total: 90
- Time zone: UTC+1 (CET)
  - Summer (DST): UTC+2 (CEST)
- Postal code: 14-202
- Vehicle registration: NIL

Dół (Polish pronunciation: [ˈduw]) is a village in the administrative district of Gmina Iława, within Iława County, Warmian-Masurian Voivodeship, in northern Poland. It is situated on the eastern shore of Iławskie Lake, in the region of Powiśle.
