= Wilczany =

- Village
- Location within Poland
- Coordinates: 53°40′N 19°40′E
- Country: Poland
- Voivodeship: Warmian-Masurian
- Powiat: Iława
- Gmina: Iława

Wilczany [vilˈt͡ʂanɨ] is a village in the administrative district of Gmina Iława, within Iława County, Warmian-Masurian Voivodeship, in northern Poland.
