= Rudzienice-Kałdunki =

- Settlement
- Location within Poland
- Coordinates: 53°37′39″N 19°40′53″E
- Country: Poland
- Voivodeship: Warmian-Masurian
- County: Iława
- Gmina: Iława

Rudzienice-Kałdunki [rud͡ʑɛˈnit͡sɛ kau̯ˈdunki] is a settlement in the administrative district of Gmina Iława, within Iława County, Warmian-Masurian Voivodeship, in northern Poland.
