= Mały Bór, Warmian-Masurian Voivodeship =

Mały Bór
- Settlement
- Location within Poland
- Coordinates: 53°32′12″N 19°40′18″E
- Country: Poland
- Voivodeship: Warmian-Masurian
- County: Iława
- Gmina: Iława

Mały Bór (Polish: [ˈmawɨ ˈbur]) is a settlement in the administrative district of Gmina Iława, within Iława County, Warmian-Masurian Voivodeship, in northern Poland.
