= Makovo =

Makovo (Cyrillic Маково) may refer to:

- Makovo, Bulgaria, a village in northeastern Bulgaria
- Makovo, North Macedonia, a village in southwestern North Macedonia
- Several rural localities in Russia:
  - Makovo, Astrakhan Oblast, a village in Makovsky Selsoviet of Volodarsky District, Astrakhan Oblast
  - Makovo, Kaluga Oblast, a village in Babyninsky District, Kaluga Oblast
  - Makovo, Lipetsk Oblast, a village in Lomigorsky Selsoviet of Volovsky District, Lipetsk Oblast
  - Makovo, Ryazan Oblast, a village in Streletsko-Vyselsky Rural Okrug of Mikhaylovsky District, Ryazan Oblast

== See also ==
- Makowo (disambiguation)
