= Nowa Wieś, Iława County =

Nowa Wieś
- Village
- Location within Poland
- Coordinates: 53°35′N 19°39′E
- Country: Poland
- Voivodeship: Warmian-Masurian
- County: Iława
- Gmina: Iława
- Population: 559

Nowa Wieś [ˈnɔva ˈvjɛɕ] is a village in the administrative district of Gmina Iława, within Iława County, Warmian-Masurian Voivodeship, in northern Poland.
