= Szwalewo =

Settlement in Gmina Iława, northern Poland

- Settlement
- Location within Poland
- Coordinates: 53°43′44″N 19°33′37″E
- Country: Poland
- Voivodeship: Warmian-Masurian
- County: Iława
- Gmina: Iława

Szwalewo [ʂfaˈlɛvɔ] is a settlement in the administrative district of Gmina Iława, within Iława County, Warmian-Masurian Voivodeship, in northern Poland.
