= Papiermühle =

Papiermühle (German for "paper mill") may refer to:

- Papiermühle (Engelskirchen), a part of Engelskirchen, North Rhine-Westphalia, Germany
- Homburger Papiermühle, a part of Nümbrecht, North Rhine-Westphalia, Germany
- Papiermühle, the German name for the village Papiernia, Warmian-Masurian Voivodeship, Poland
- Basel Paper Mill (Basler Papiermühle), a museum in Basel, Switzerland, dedicated to paper making
