= Gardzień =

- Village
- Location within Poland
- Coordinates: 53°40′N 19°32′E
- Country: Poland
- Voivodeship: Warmian-Masurian
- County: Iława
- Gmina: Iława

Gardzień [ˈɡard͡ʑɛɲ] is a village in the administrative district of Gmina Iława, within Iława County, Warmian-Masurian Voivodeship, in northern Poland.

== People ==
- Werner von Gustedt-Lablacken (1842-1908), German politician, member of Reichstag
