= Windyki, Warmian-Masurian Voivodeship =

Windyki
- Settlement
- Location within Poland
- Coordinates: 53°38′06″N 19°37′15″E
- Country: Poland
- Voivodeship: Warmian-Masurian
- County: Iława
- Gmina: Iława

Windyki [vinˈdɨki] is a settlement in the administrative district of Gmina Iława, within Iława County, Warmian-Masurian Voivodeship, in northern Poland.
