= Julin =

Julin may refer to:

- Julin (surname)
- Julin, Warmian-Masurian Voivodeship a settlement in (north Poland)
- Julin, a semi-legendary medieval settlement thought to be identical with Jomsborg, Vineta and the modern town of Wolin in north-west Poland
- Operation Julin, a series of nuclear tests conducted in 1991–1992 by the United States
- Julin Bristol, codename of the nuclear weapon test conducted at the Nevada Test Site on 26 November 1991
