= Kamień, Iława County =

Kamień
- Village
- Location within Poland
- Coordinates: 53°37′38″N 19°35′27″E
- Country: Poland
- Voivodeship: Warmian-Masurian
- County: Iława
- Gmina: Iława

Kamień (Polish pronunciation: [ˈkamjɛj̃]; German: Stein) is a village in the administrative district of Gmina Iława, within Iława County, Warmian–Masurian Voivodeship, in northern Poland.
