= Stawiec, Warmian-Masurian Voivodeship =

Stawiec
- Settlement
- Location within Poland
- Coordinates: 53°43′34″N 19°26′12″E
- Country: Poland
- Voivodeship: Warmian-Masurian
- County: Iława
- Gmina: Susz
- Time zone: UTC+1 (CET)
  - Summer (DST): UTC+2 (CEST)

Stawiec [ˈstavjɛt͡s] is a settlement in the administrative district of Gmina Susz, within Iława County, Warmian-Masurian Voivodeship, in northern Poland.
