= Tchórzanka =

- Village
- Location within Poland
- Coordinates: 53°34′31″N 19°40′47″E
- Country: Poland
- Voivodeship: Warmian-Masurian
- County: Iława
- Gmina: Iława
- Population: 42

Tchórzanka [txuˈʐanka] is a village in the administrative district of Gmina Iława, within Iława County, Warmian-Masurian Voivodeship, in northern Poland.
