= Zazdrość, Iława County =

Zazdrość
- Village
- Location within Poland
- Coordinates: 53°34′26″N 19°24′7″E
- Country: Poland
- Voivodeship: Warmian-Masurian
- County: Iława
- Gmina: Iława

Zazdrość [ˈzazdrɔɕt͡ɕ] is a village in the administrative district of Gmina Iława, within Iława County, Warmian-Masurian Voivodeship, in northern Poland.
