= Chełmżyca =

- Village
- Location within Poland
- Coordinates: 53°40′01″N 19°27′17″E
- Country: Poland
- Voivodeship: Warmian-Masurian
- County: Iława
- Gmina: Susz
- Population: 16
- Time zone: UTC+1 (CET)
  - Summer (DST): UTC+2 (CEST)

Chełmżyca [xɛu̯mˈʐɨt͡sa] is a village in the administrative district of Gmina Susz, within Iława County, Warmian-Masurian Voivodeship, in northern Poland.
