= Roznowo =

Roznowo may refer to the following places:

- Rożnowo, Greater Poland Voivodeship (west-central Poland)
- Rożnowo, West Pomeranian Voivodeship (north-west Poland)
- Różnowo, Kuyavian-Pomeranian Voivodeship (north-central Poland)
- Różnowo, Iława County in Warmian-Masurian Voivodeship (north Poland)
- Różnowo, Olsztyn County in Warmian-Masurian Voivodeship (north Poland)
- Różnowo, Ostróda County in Warmian-Masurian Voivodeship (north Poland)
