= Michałowo, Warmian-Masurian Voivodeship =

Michałowo
- Village
- Location within Poland
- Coordinates: 53°43′33″N 19°22′14″E
- Country: Poland
- Voivodeship: Warmian-Masurian
- County: Iława
- Gmina: Susz
- Population: 130
- Time zone: UTC+1 (CET)
  - Summer (DST): UTC+2 (CEST)

Michałowo [mixaˈwɔvɔ] is a village in the administrative district of Gmina Susz, within Iława County, Warmian-Masurian Voivodeship, in northern Poland.
