= Drwęca (disambiguation) =

The Drwęca is a river in northern Poland.

Drwęca may also refer to the following places in Poland:

- Drwęca, Greater Poland Voivodeship (west-central Poland)
- Drwęca, Iława County in Warmian-Masurian Voivodeship (north Poland)
- Drwęca, Lidzbark County in Warmian-Masurian Voivodeship (north Poland)
- Lake Drwęca
