= Bornice =

- Village
- Location within Poland
- Coordinates: 53°47′55″N 19°21′58″E
- Country: Poland
- Voivodeship: Warmian-Masurian
- County: Iława
- Gmina: Susz
- Population: 160
- Time zone: UTC+1 (CET)
  - Summer (DST): UTC+2 (CEST)

Bornice [bɔrˈnit͡sɛ] is a small village in the administrative district of Gmina Susz, within Iława County, Warmian-Masurian Voivodeship, in northern Poland.
