= Wądoły =

- Settlement
- Location within Poland
- Coordinates: 53°39′38″N 19°17′55″E
- Country: Poland
- Voivodeship: Warmian-Masurian
- County: Iława
- Gmina: Susz
- Population: 29
- Time zone: UTC+1 (CET)
  - Summer (DST): UTC+2 (CEST)

Wądoły [vɔnˈdɔwɨ] is a settlement in the administrative district of Gmina Susz, within Iława County, Warmian-Masurian Voivodeship, in northern Poland.
