= Owczarnia, Iława County =

Owczarnia
- Settlement
- Location within Poland
- Coordinates: 53°37′16″N 19°24′15″E
- Country: Poland
- Voivodeship: Warmian-Masurian
- County: Iława
- Gmina: Iława

Owczarnia [ɔfˈt͡ʂarɲa] is a settlement in the administrative district of Gmina Iława, within Iława County, Warmian-Masurian Voivodeship, in northern Poland.
