= Kamień Mały, Warmian-Masurian Voivodeship =

Kamień Mały
- Village
- Location within Poland
- Coordinates: 53°37′48″N 19°35′59″E
- Country: Poland
- Voivodeship: Warmian-Masurian
- County: Iława
- Gmina: Iława

Kamień Mały (Polish pronunciation: [ˈkamjɛj̃ ˈmawɨ]) is a village in the administrative district of Gmina Iława, within Iława County, Warmian-Masurian Voivodeship, in northern Poland.
