= Jawty Małe =

- Village
- Location within Poland
- Coordinates: 53°42′25″N 19°16′58″E
- Country: Poland
- Voivodeship: Warmian-Masurian
- County: Iława
- Gmina: Susz

Population
  - Total: 125
- Time zone: UTC+1 (CET)
  - Summer (DST): UTC+2 (CEST)
- Vehicle registration: NIL

Jawty Małe [ˈjaftɨ ˈmawɛ] is a village in the administrative district of Gmina Susz, within Iława County, Warmian-Masurian Voivodeship, in northern Poland.

Two Polish citizens were murdered by Nazi Germany in the village during World War II.
