= Rudzienice =

- Village
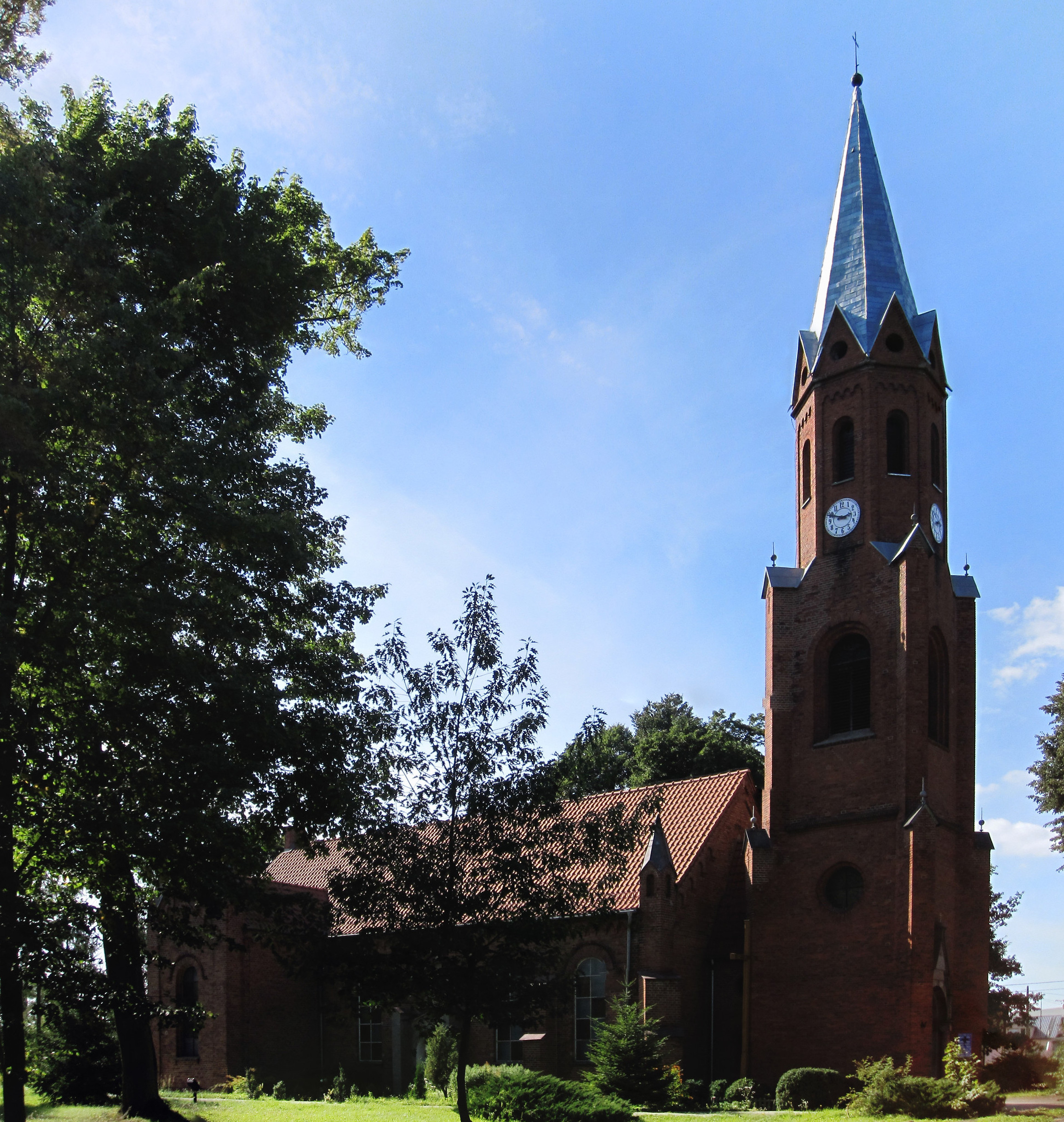
- Virgin Mary Queen of Poland church in Rudzienice

- Location within Poland
- Coordinates: 53°38′N 19°40′E
- Country: Poland
- Voivodeship: Warmian-Masurian
- County: Iława
- Gmina: Iława
- Time zone: UTC+1 (CET)
  - Summer (DST): UTC+2 (CEST)
- Vehicle registration: NIL

Rudzienice [rud͡ʑɛˈnit͡sɛ] is a village in the administrative district of Gmina Iława, within Iława County, Warmian-Masurian Voivodeship, in northern Poland.

In October 1831, several Polish infantry and artillery units, engineer corps and sappers of the November Uprising stopped in the village on the way to their internment places.

There is a train station in the village.
