= Gałdowo =

- Village
- Location within Poland
- Coordinates: 53°38′N 19°25′E
- Country: Poland
- Voivodeship: Warmian-Masurian
- County: Iława
- Gmina: Iława
- Population: 494

Gałdowo [ɡau̯ˈdɔvɔ] is a village in the administrative district of Gmina Iława, within Iława County, Warmian-Masurian Voivodeship, in northern Poland.
