= Wiewiórka, Warmian-Masurian Voivodeship =

Wiewiórka
- Village
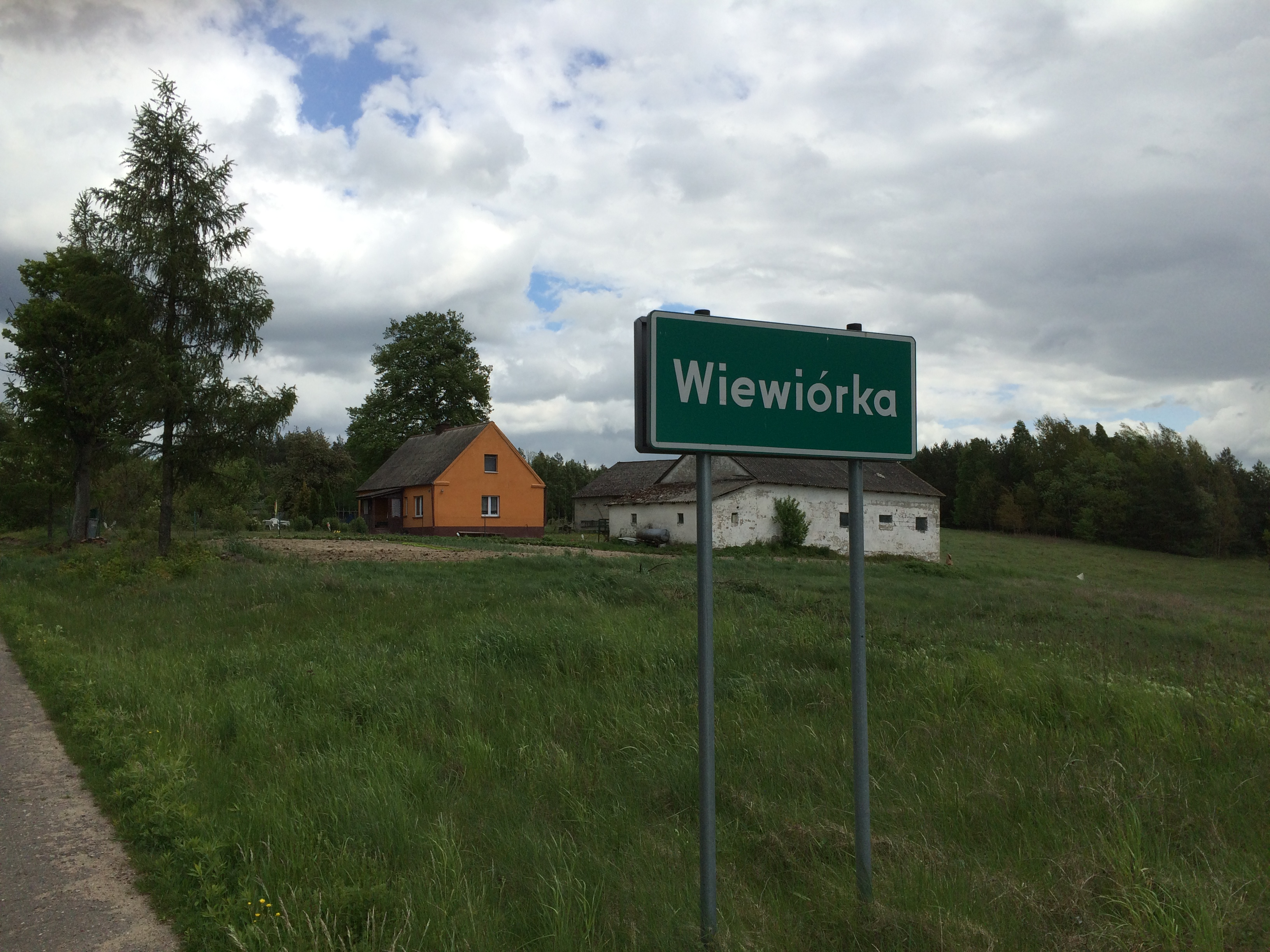
- Entrance to Wiewiórka

- Location within Poland
- Coordinates: 53°40′9″N 19°43′15″E
- Country: Poland
- Voivodeship: Warmian-Masurian
- County: Iława
- Gmina: Iława

Wiewiórka [vjɛˈvjurka] is a village in the administrative district of Gmina Iława, within Iława County, Warmian-Masurian Voivodeship, in northern Poland.
