= Kamionka, Iława County =

Kamionka
- Village
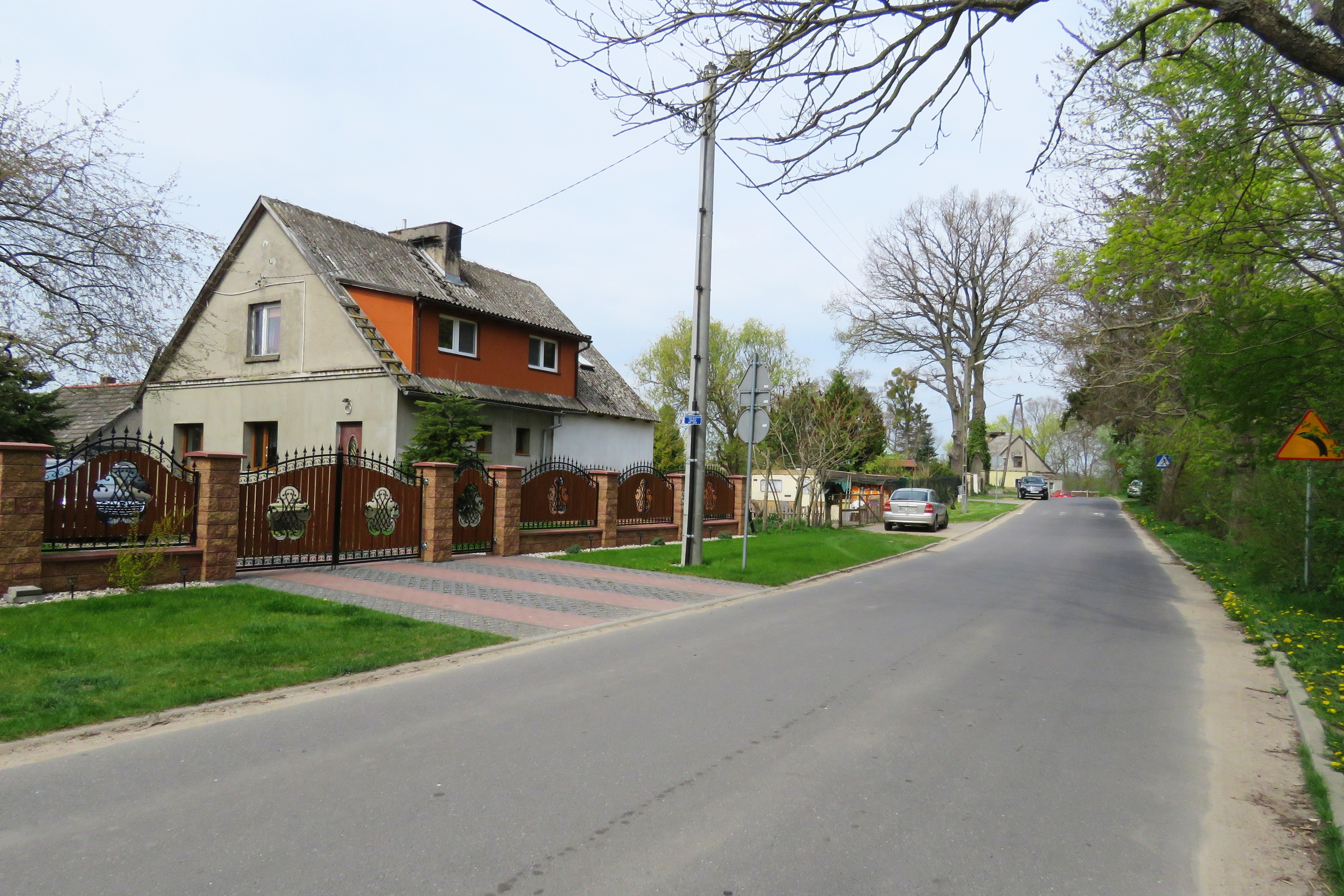
- Village center

- Location within Poland
- Coordinates: 53°36′58″N 19°29′56″E
- Country: Poland
- Voivodeship: Warmian-Masurian
- County: Iława
- Gmina: Iława
- Time zone: UTC+1 (CET)
  - Summer (DST): UTC+2 (CEST)
- Vehicle registration: NIL

Kamionka [kaˈmjɔnka] is a village in the administrative district of Gmina Iława, within Iława County, Warmian-Masurian Voivodeship, in northern Poland.

Kamionka is situated between the Szymbarskie Lake in the north and Silm Lake in the south. Kamionka is known for the Ship Handling, Research and Training Centre.
