= Stanowo, Warmian-Masurian Voivodeship =

Stanowo
- Village
- Location within Poland
- Coordinates: 53°40′N 19°46′E
- Country: Poland
- Voivodeship: Warmian-Masurian
- Powiat: Iława
- Gmina: Iława

Stanowo [staˈnɔvɔ] is a village in the administrative district of Gmina Iława, within Iława County, Warmian-Masurian Voivodeship, in northern Poland.
