= Borek, Iława County =

Borek
- Village
- Location within Poland
- Coordinates: 53°37′51″N 19°44′30″E
- Country: Poland
- Voivodeship: Warmian-Masurian
- County: Iława
- Gmina: Iława

Borek [ˈbɔrɛk] is a village in the administrative district of Gmina Iława, within Iława County, Warmian-Masurian Voivodeship, in northern Poland.
