= Kaletka =

- Settlement
- Location within Poland
- Coordinates: 53°41′09″N 19°40′52″E
- Country: Poland
- Voivodeship: Warmian-Masurian
- County: Iława
- Gmina: Iława
- Elevation: 163 m (535 ft)

Kaletka [kaˈlɛtka] is a settlement in the administrative district of Gmina Iława, within Iława County, Warmian-Masurian Voivodeship, in northern Poland.
