= Kałduny, Warmian-Masurian Voivodeship =

Kałduny
- Village
- Location within Poland
- Coordinates: 53°37′N 19°40′E
- Country: Poland
- Voivodeship: Warmian-Masurian
- County: Iława
- Gmina: Iława
- Population (approx.): 400

Kałduny [kau̯ˈdunɨ] is a village in the administrative district of Gmina Iława, within Iława County, Warmian-Masurian Voivodeship, in northern Poland.
