= Karrasch =

Karrasch may refer to:

- Karaś, Warmian-Masurian Voivodeship, Poland

== People with the surname ==
- Audrey Karrasch, contestant on season 4 of The Voice
- Haimish Karrasch (born 1976), Australian Olympic rower
