= Krzywiec, Iława County =

Krzywiec
- Village
- Location within Poland
- Coordinates: 53°40′N 19°21′E
- Country: Poland
- Voivodeship: Warmian-Masurian
- County: Iława
- Gmina: Susz
- Population: 90
- Time zone: UTC+1 (CET)
  - Summer (DST): UTC+2 (CEST)

Krzywiec [ˈkʂɨvjɛt͡s] is a village in the administrative district of Gmina Susz, within Iława County, Warmian-Masurian Voivodeship, in northern Poland.
