= Czerwona Woda, Iława County =

Czerwona Woda
- Village
- Location within Poland
- Coordinates: 53°40′N 19°22′E
- Country: Poland
- Voivodeship: Warmian-Masurian
- County: Iława
- Gmina: Susz

Population
  - Total: 100
- Time zone: UTC+1 (CET)
  - Summer (DST): UTC+2 (CEST)
- Vehicle registration: NIL

Czerwona Woda [t͡ʂɛrˈvɔna ˈvɔda] is a village in the administrative district of Gmina Susz, within Iława County, Warmian-Masurian Voivodeship, in northern Poland.

Historical population
Year	Pop.	±%
1868	233	—
1885	223	−4.3%
