= Dąbrowa, Iława County =

Dąbrowa
- Settlement
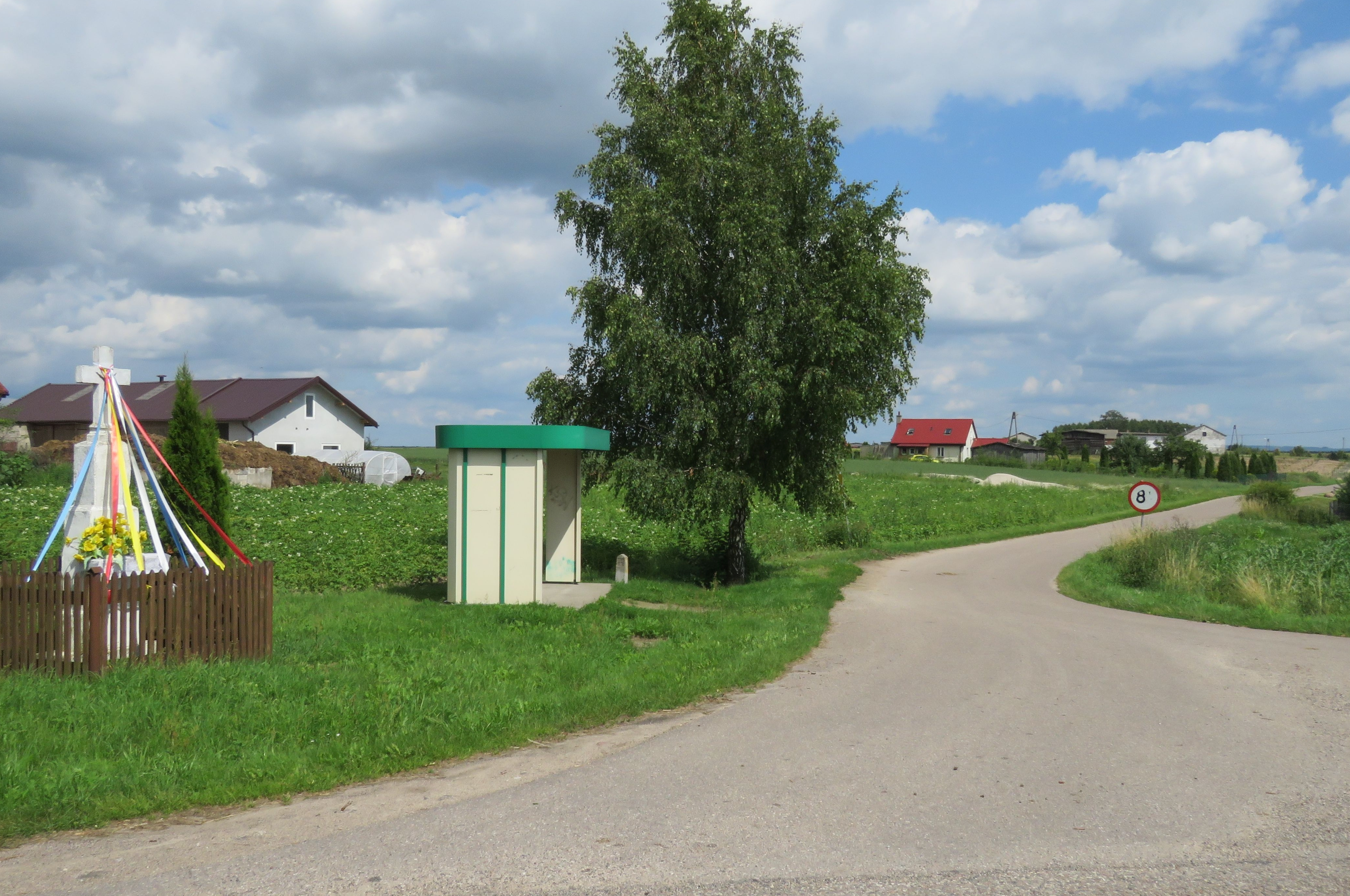

- Location within Poland
- Coordinates: 53°36′31″N 19°42′18″E
- Country: Poland
- Voivodeship: Warmian-Masurian
- County: Iława
- Gmina: Iława
- Time zone: UTC+1 (CET)
  - Summer (DST): UTC+2 (CEST)
- Vehicle registration: NIL

Dąbrowa [dɔmˈbrɔva] is a settlement in the administrative district of Gmina Iława, within Iława County, Warmian-Masurian Voivodeship, in northern Poland.
