= Smolniki, Warmian-Masurian Voivodeship =

Smolniki
- Village
- Location within Poland
- Coordinates: 53°33′N 19°36′E
- Country: Poland
- Voivodeship: Warmian-Masurian
- County: Iława
- Gmina: Iława
- Population: 160

Smolniki [smɔlˈniki] is a village in the administrative district of Gmina Iława, within Iława County, Warmian-Masurian Voivodeship, in northern Poland.
