= Rudzienice-Karłowo =

- Settlement
- Location within Poland
- Coordinates: 53°38′09″N 19°39′19″E
- Country: Poland
- Voivodeship: Warmian-Masurian
- County: Iława
- Gmina: Iława

Rudzienice-Karłowo [rud͡ʑɛˈnit͡sɛ karˈwɔvɔ] is a settlement in the administrative district of Gmina Iława, within Iława County, Warmian-Masurian Voivodeship, in northern Poland.
