= Siemiany, Warmian-Masurian Voivodeship =

Siemiany
- Village
- Location within Poland
- Coordinates: 53°44′N 19°35′E
- Country: Poland
- Voivodeship: Warmian-Masurian
- County: Iława
- Gmina: Iława

Siemiany [ɕɛˈmjanɨ] is a village in the administrative district of Gmina Iława, within Iława County, Warmian-Masurian Voivodeship, in northern Poland.
