= Jażdżówki =

- Settlement
- Location within Poland
- Coordinates: 53°40′12″N 19°37′12″E
- Country: Poland
- Voivodeship: Warmian-Masurian
- County: Iława
- Gmina: Iława

Jażdżówki [jaʐˈd͡ʐufki] is a settlement in the administrative district of Gmina Iława, within Iława County, Warmian-Masurian Voivodeship, in northern Poland.
