= Pikus, Warmian-Masurian Voivodeship =

Pikus
- Village
- Location within Poland
- Coordinates: 53°39′32″N 19°44′17″E
- Country: Poland
- Voivodeship: Warmian-Masurian
- County: Iława
- Gmina: Iława
- Population: 100

Pikus [ˈpikus] is a village in the administrative district of Gmina Iława, within Iława County, Warmian-Masurian Voivodeship, in northern Poland.
