= Jezierzyce, Warmian-Masurian Voivodeship =

Jezierzyce
- Village
- Location within Poland
- Coordinates: 53°40′26″N 19°37′57″E
- Country: Poland
- Voivodeship: Warmian-Masurian
- County: Iława
- Gmina: Iława
- Population: 60

Jezierzyce [jɛʑɛˈʐɨt͡sɛ] is a village in the administrative district of Gmina Iława, within Iława County, Warmian-Masurian Voivodeship, in northern Poland.
