= Falknowo Małe =

- Settlement
- Location within Poland
- Coordinates: 53°39′54″N 19°25′44″E
- Country: Poland
- Voivodeship: Warmian-Masurian
- County: Iława
- Gmina: Susz
- Time zone: UTC+1 (CET)
  - Summer (DST): UTC+2 (CEST)

Falknowo Małe [falkˈnɔvɔ ˈmawɛ] is a settlement in the administrative district of Gmina Susz, within Iława County, Warmian-Masurian Voivodeship, in northern Poland.
