= Piotrkowo =

Piotrkowo may refer to the following places:

- Piotrkowo, Kuyavian-Pomeranian Voivodeship (north-central Poland)
- Piotrkowo, Iława County in Warmian-Masurian Voivodeship (north Poland)
- Piotrkowo, Nidzica County in Warmian-Masurian Voivodeship (north Poland)
