= Janowo, Iława County =

Janowo
- Village
- Location within Poland
- Coordinates: 53°48′29″N 19°20′16″E
- Country: Poland
- Voivodeship: Warmian-Masurian
- County: Iława
- Gmina: Susz
- Population: 0
- Time zone: UTC+1 (CET)
  - Summer (DST): UTC+2 (CEST)

Janowo [jaˈnɔvɔ] is a former village in the administrative district of Gmina Susz, within Iława County, Warmian-Masurian Voivodeship, in northern Poland.
