= Olbrachtówko =

- Village
- Location within Poland
- Coordinates: 53°43′23″N 19°25′07″E
- Country: Poland
- Voivodeship: Warmian-Masurian
- County: Iława
- Gmina: Susz
- Population: 170
- Time zone: UTC+1 (CET)
  - Summer (DST): UTC+2 (CEST)

Olbrachtówko [ɔlbraxˈtufkɔ] is a village in the administrative district of Gmina Susz, within Iława County, Warmian-Masurian Voivodeship, in northern Poland.
