= Bałoszyce =

- Village
- Location within Poland
- Coordinates: 53°41′N 19°17′E
- Country: Poland
- Voivodeship: Warmian-Masurian
- County: Iława
- Gmina: Susz
- Time zone: UTC+1 (CET)
  - Summer (DST): UTC+2 (CEST)

Bałoszyce [bawɔˈʂɨt͡sɛ] is a village in the administrative district of Gmina Susz, within Iława County, Warmian-Masurian Voivodeship, in northern Poland.

In 1947, village residents who did not identify as Poles were expelled. Those who had names ending in "ki"in contrast were seen as Poles and were not allowed to exit to Germany.
