= Falknowo =

- Village
- Location within Poland
- Coordinates: 53°40′49″N 19°26′6″E
- Country: Poland
- Voivodeship: Warmian-Masurian
- County: Iława
- Gmina: Susz
- Population: 140
- Time zone: UTC+1 (CET)
  - Summer (DST): UTC+2 (CEST)

Falknowo [falkˈnɔvɔ] is a village in the administrative district of Gmina Susz, within Iława County, Warmian-Masurian Voivodeship, in northern Poland.
