= Łowizowo =

- Settlement
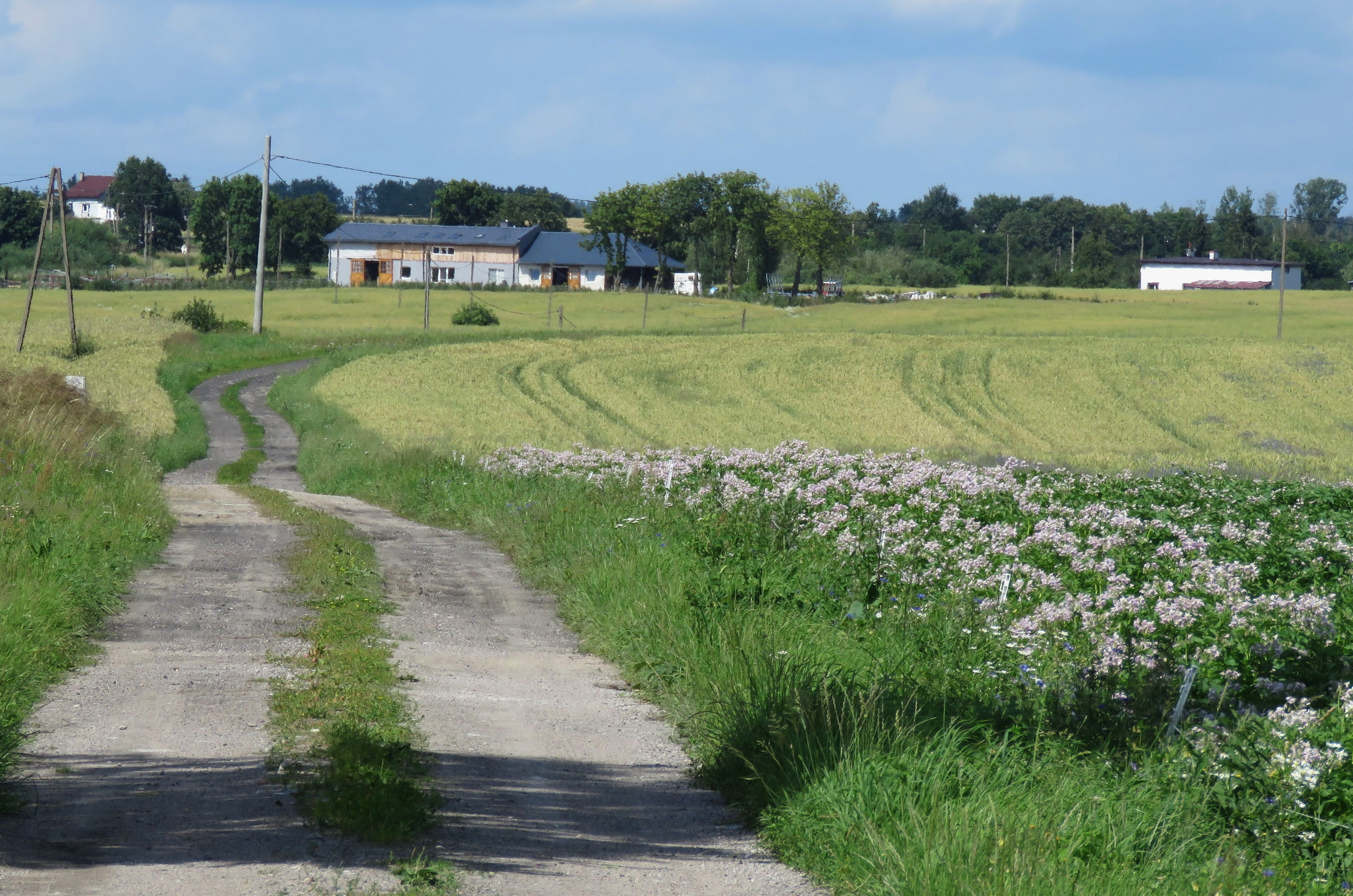

- Location within Poland
- Coordinates: 53°37′00″N 19°38′29″E
- Country: Poland
- Voivodeship: Warmian-Masurian
- County: Iława
- Gmina: Iława

Łowizowo [wɔviˈzɔvɔ] is a settlement in the administrative district of Gmina Iława, within Iława County, Warmian-Masurian Voivodeship, in northern Poland.
