= Gromoty =

- Village
- Location within Poland
- Coordinates: 53°37′N 19°43′E
- Country: Poland
- Voivodeship: Warmian-Masurian
- County: Iława
- Gmina: Iława

Gromoty [ɡrɔˈmɔtɨ] is a village in the administrative district of Gmina Iława, within Iława County, Warmian-Masurian Voivodeship, in northern Poland.
