= Ząbrowo, Warmian-Masurian Voivodeship =

Ząbrowo
- Village
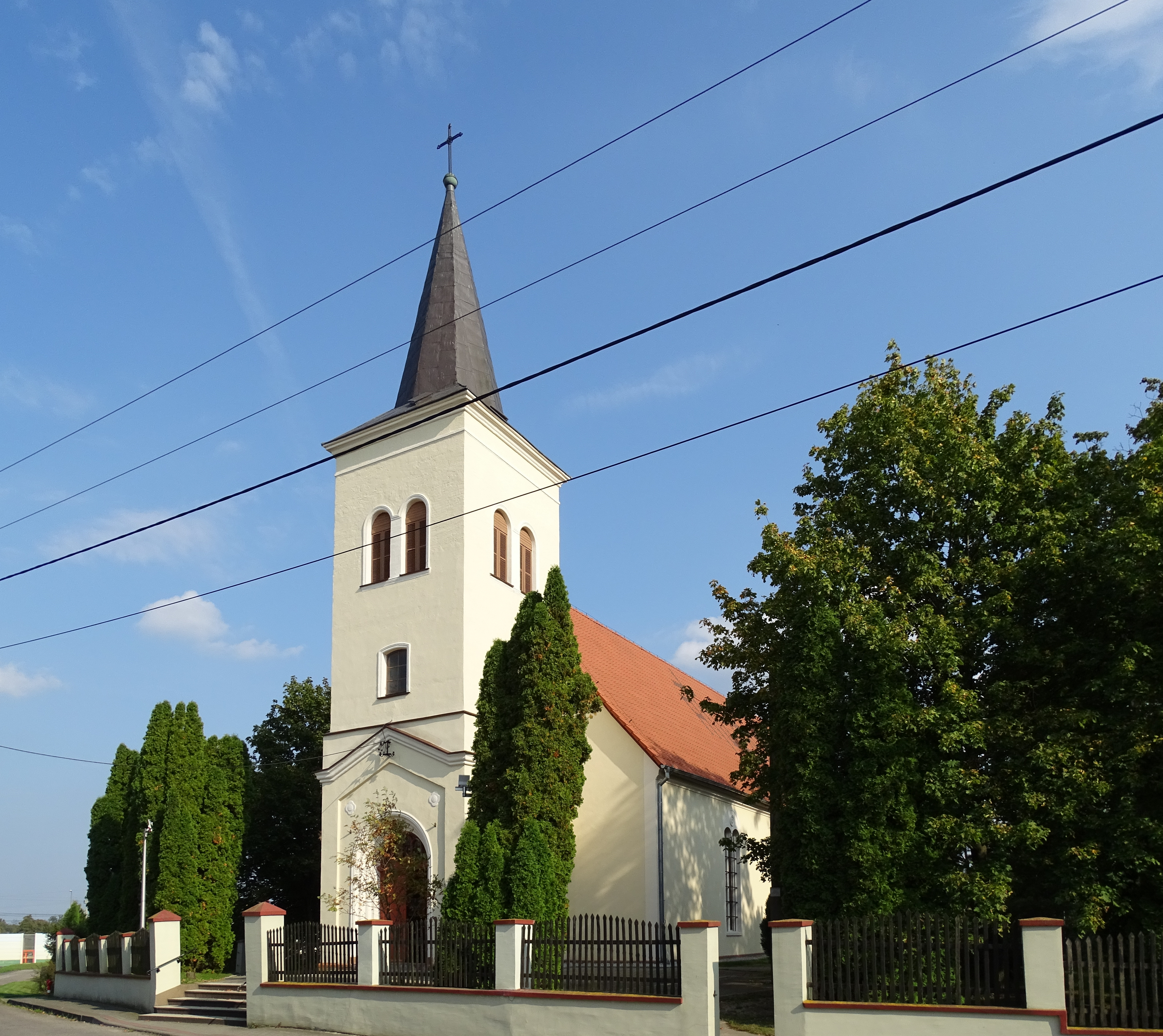
- Parish church.

- Location within Poland
- Coordinates: 53°38′N 19°27′E
- Country: Poland
- Voivodeship: Warmian-Masurian
- County: Iława
- Gmina: Iława
- Population: 1,032

Ząbrowo [zɔmˈbrɔvɔ] is a village in the administrative district of Gmina Iława, within Iława County, Warmian-Masurian Voivodeship, in northern Poland.
