= Tinwald =

Tinwald may refer to:

== Places ==
- Tinwald, New Zealand
- Tinwald, Dumfries and Galloway, Scotland
  - RAF Tinwald Downs, a Royal Air Force base, located near Tinwald

== See also ==
- Charles Erskine, Lord Tinwald (former Lord of Justiciary)
- Tinwald School
- Tynwald (disambiguation)
