= Dziarnówko =

- Village
- Location within Poland
- Coordinates: 53°34′N 19°38′E
- Country: Poland
- Voivodeship: Warmian-Masurian
- County: Iława
- Gmina: Iława

Dziarnówko [d͡ʑarˈnufkɔ] is a village in the administrative district of Gmina Iława, within Iława County, Warmian-Masurian Voivodeship, in northern Poland.
