= Gmina Susz =

Gmina Susz Susz Commune
- Gmina
- Coat of arms
- Interactive map of Gmina Susz
- Coordinates (Susz): 53°43′12″N 19°20′14″E
- Country: Poland
- Voivodeship: Warmian-Masurian
- County: Iława
- Seat: Susz

Area
  - Total: 258.95 km^{2} (99.98 sq mi)

Population (2006)
  - Total: 12,825
  - Density: 49.527/km^{2} (128.27/sq mi)
  - Urban: 5,610
  - Rural: 7,215
- Website: http://www.susz.pl

Gmina Susz is an urban-rural gmina (administrative district) in Iława County, Warmian-Masurian Voivodeship, in northern Poland. Its seat is the town of Susz, which lies approximately 21 kilometres (13 mi) north-west of Iława and 77 km (48 mi) west of the regional capital Olsztyn.

The gmina covers an area of 258.95 square kilometres (100.0 sq mi), and as of 2006 its total population is 12,825 (out of which the population of Susz amounts to 5,610, and the population of the rural part of the gmina is 7,215).

The gmina contains part of the protected area called Iława Lake District Landscape Park.

== Villages ==
Apart from the town of Susz, Gmina Susz contains the villages and settlements of Adamowo, Babięty Małe, Babięty Wielkie, Bałoszyce, Bałoszyce Małe, Boleszów, Bornice, Bronowo, Brusiny, Brusiny Małe, Chełmżyca, Czerwona Woda, Dąbrówka, Dolina, Emilianowo, Fabianki, Falknowo, Falknowo Małe, Grabowiec, Huta, Jakubowo Kisielickie, Janowo, Januszewo, Jawty Małe, Jawty Wielkie, Kamieniec, Karolewo, Krzywiec, Lisiec, Lubnowy Małe, Lubnowy Wielkie, Michałowo, Nipkowie, Olbrachtówko, Olbrachtowo, Piaski, Piotrkowo, Redaki, Róża, Różanki, Różnowo, Rudniki, Rumunki, Stawiec, Ulnowo, Wądoły, Wiśniówek, Żakowice, Zieleń and Zofiówka.

== Neighbouring gminas ==
Gmina Susz is bordered by the gminas of Iława, Kisielice, Prabuty, Stary Dzierzgoń and Zalewo.
