= Makowo, Warmian-Masurian Voivodeship =

Makowo
- Village
- Location within Poland
- Coordinates: 53°40′40″N 19°39′46″E
- Country: Poland
- Voivodeship: Warmian-Masurian
- County: Iława
- Gmina: Iława

Makowo [maˈkɔvɔ] is a village in the administrative district of Gmina Iława, within Iława County, Warmian-Masurian Voivodeship, in northern Poland.
