= Gmina Iława =

Gmina Iława Iława Commune
- Gmina
- Flag Coat of arms
- Interactive map of Gmina Iława
- Coordinates (Iława): 53°35′47″N 19°33′56″E
- Country: Poland
- Voivodeship: Warmian-Masurian
- County: Iława
- Seat: Iława

Area
  - Total: 423.55 km^{2} (163.53 sq mi)

Population (2006)
  - Total: 11,828
  - Density: 27.926/km^{2} (72.328/sq mi)
- Website: https://www.gmina-ilawa.pl/

Gmina Iława is a rural gmina (administrative district) in Iława County, Warmian-Masurian Voivodeship, in northern Poland. Its seat is the town of Iława, although the town is not part of the territory of the gmina.

The gmina covers an area of 423.55 square kilometres (163.5 sq mi), and as of 2006 its total population is 11,828.

The gmina contains part of the protected area called Iława Lake District Landscape Park.

== Villages ==
Gmina Iława contains the villages and settlements of Borek, Dąbrowa, Dół, Drwęca, Dziarnówko, Dziarny, Emilianowo, Franciszkowo, Franciszkowo Dolne, Frednowy, Gałdowo, Gardzień, Gromoty, Gulb, Jachimówka, Jażdżówki, Jezierzyce, Jeziorno, Julin, Kałduny, Kaletka, Kamień, Kamień Mały, Kamionka, Karaś, Katarzynki, Kozianka, Kwiry, Laseczno, Laseczno Małe, Ławice, Łowizowo, Makowo, Mały Bór, Mątyki, Mózgowo, Nejdyki, Nowa Wieś, Nowy Ostrów, Owczarnia, Papiernia, Pikus, Prasneta, Praszki, Przejazd, Radomek, Rudzienice, Rudzienice-Kałdunki, Rudzienice-Karłowo, Sąpy, Sarnówek, Segnowy, Siemiany, Skarszewo, Smolniki, Stanowo, Starzykowo, Stradomno, Szałkowo, Szczepkowo, Szeplerzyzna, Szwalewo, Szymbark, Tchórzanka, Tłokowisko, Tynwałd, Urwisko, Wiewiórka, Wikielec, Wilczany, Windyki, Wola Kamieńska, Ząbrowo and Zazdrość.

== Neighbouring gminas ==
Gmina Iława is bordered by the town of Iława and by the gminas of Biskupiec, Kisielice, Lubawa, Miłomłyn, Nowe Miasto Lubawskie, Ostróda, Susz and Zalewo.
