= Karaś, Warmian-Masurian Voivodeship =

Karaś
- Village
- Location within Poland
- Coordinates: 53°34′N 19°30′E
- Country: Poland
- Voivodeship: Warmian-Masurian
- County: Iława
- Gmina: Iława

Karaś [ˈkaraɕ] is a village in the administrative district of Gmina Iława, within Iława County, Warmian-Masurian Voivodeship, in northern Poland.

== Notable residents ==
- Max Winkler (1875–1961), Mayor of Graudenz
