= Julin, Warmian-Masurian Voivodeship =

Julin
- Settlement
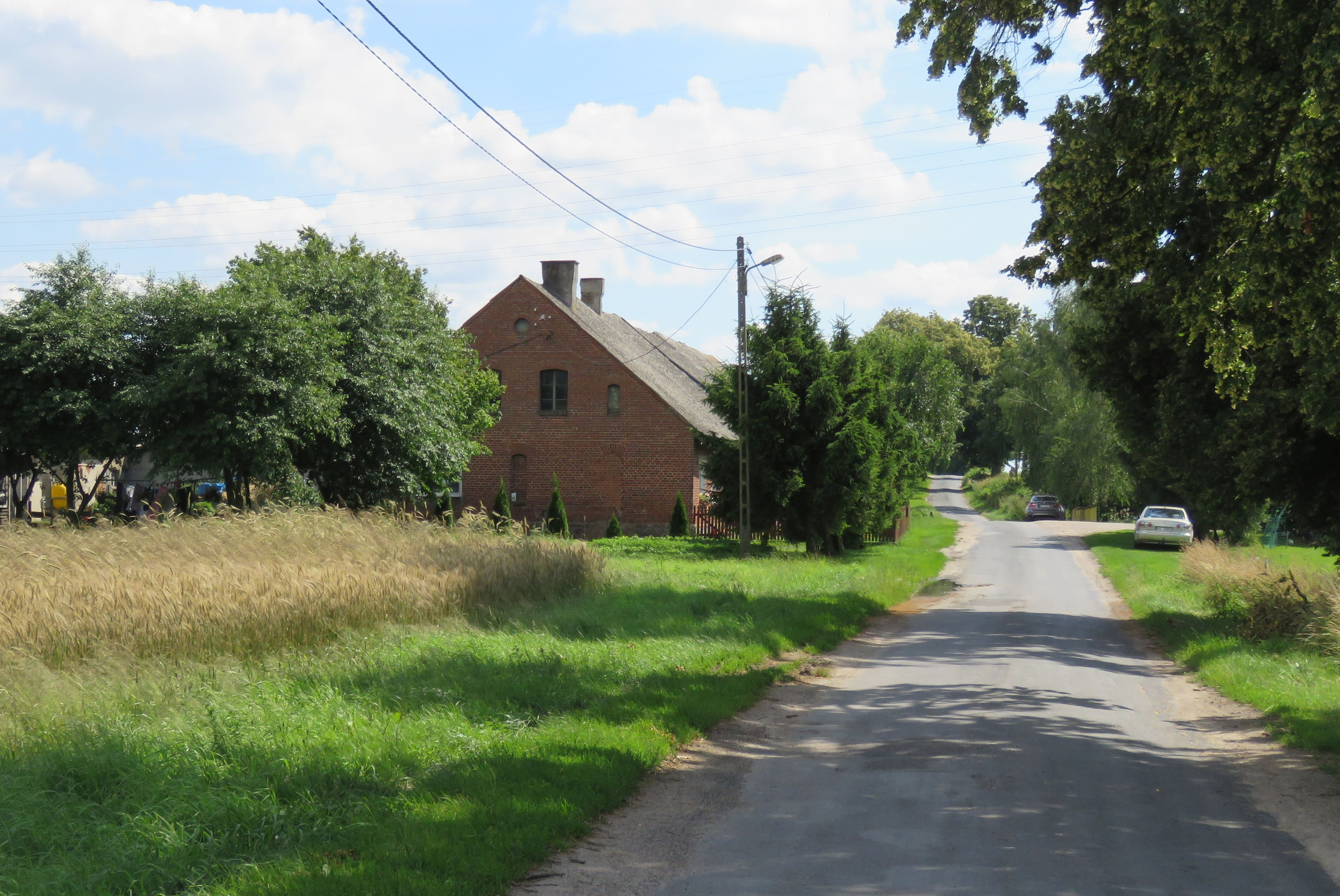

- Location within Poland
- Coordinates: 53°36′21″N 19°39′59″E
- Country: Poland
- Voivodeship: Warmian-Masurian
- County: Iława
- Gmina: Iława

Julin [ˈjulin] is a settlement in the administrative district of Gmina Iława, within Iława County, Warmian-Masurian Voivodeship, in northern Poland.
