= Lisiec =

Lisiec may refer to the following places in Poland:

- Lisiec, Lower Silesian Voivodeship (south-west Poland)
- Lisiec, Warmian-Masurian Voivodeship (north Poland)
