= Kozianka =

- Settlement
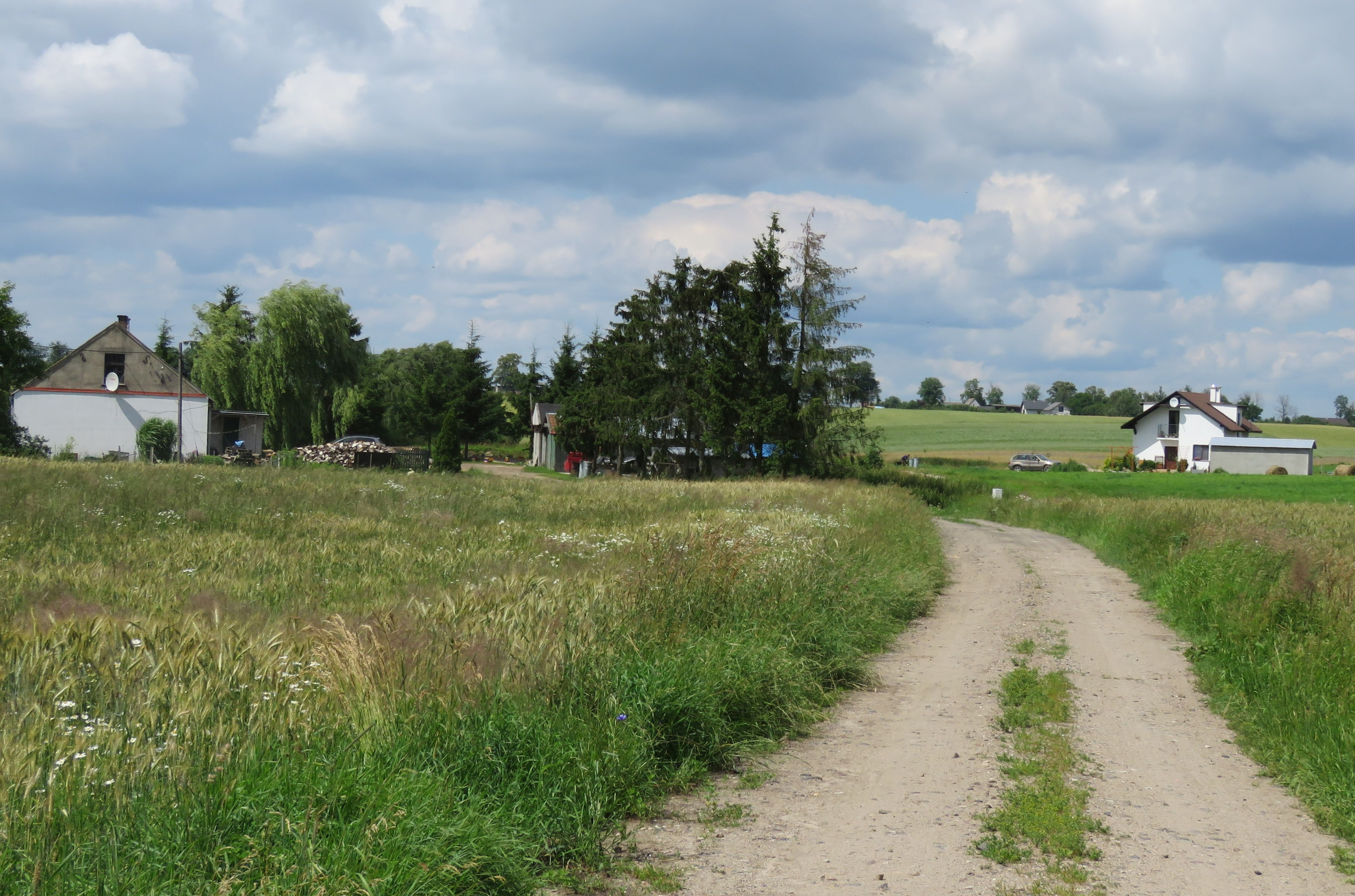
- Street of Kozianka village, Ilawa, Poland

- Location within Poland
- Coordinates: 53°33′53″N 19°37′59″E
- Country: Poland
- Voivodeship: Warmian-Masurian
- County: Iława
- Gmina: Iława

Kozianka [kɔˈʑanka] is a settlement in the administrative district of Gmina Iława, within Iława County, Warmian-Masurian Voivodeship, in northern Poland.
