= Lisiec, Warmian-Masurian Voivodeship =

Lisiec
- Settlement
- Location within Poland
- Coordinates: 53°45′6″N 19°22′51″E
- Country: Poland
- Voivodeship: Warmian-Masurian
- County: Iława
- Gmina: Susz
- Time zone: UTC+1 (CET)
  - Summer (DST): UTC+2 (CEST)

Lisiec (Polish pronunciation: [ˈliɕɛts]) is a settlement in the administrative district of Gmina Susz, within Iława County, Warmian-Masurian Voivodeship, in northern Poland.
