= SS Tynwald =

SS Tynwald may refer to:

- PS Tynwald (1846), served with the Isle of Man Steam Packet Company from 1846 to 1866
- PS Tynwald (1866), served with the Isle of Man Steam Packet Company from 1866 to 1888
- SS Tynwald (1891), served with the Isle of Man Steam Packet Company from 1891 to 1934
- RMS Tynwald (1936), served with the Isle of Man Steam Packet Company from 1936 to 1939; requisitioned by the Royal Navy in 1939 and sunk in 1942
- TSS Tynwald (1947), served with the Isle of Man Steam Packet Company from 1947 to 1974
- MV Tynwald (1967) (IOMSPCo. 1986–1990) ex-Antrim Princess; previous Manx service with Sealink
