= Makowo, Morogoro =

Coordinates: 6.36616167°S 37.00010469°E

Makowo
- Village
- Interactive map of Makowo
- Country: Tanzania
- Region: Morogoro Region
- District: Gairo District
- Ward: Mandege
- Time zone: UTC+3 (EAT)
- Postcode: 67703

Makowo is a village in Gairo District in the Morogoro Region of Tanzania.
