= Liebenau =

Liebenau can refer to:

Places in Germany

- Liebenau, Hesse, a town in the district of Kassel, Hesse
- Liebenau, Lower Saxony, a municipality in the district of Nienburg, Lower Saxony
- Liebenau (Samtgemeinde), a former collective municipality which included Liebenau, Lower Saxony
- Liebenau monastery, a former Dominican monastery in Worms, Germany

Places in Austria

- Liebenau (Graz), a district of the city of Graz, Styria
  - Stadion Graz-Liebenau, a football stadium in Graz-Liebenau
- Liebenau, Upper Austria, a municipality in the district of Freistadt, Upper Austria

Places in Czech Republic

- Liebenau, Bohemia, historic name, now Hodkovice nad Mohelkou
- Liebenau, Bohemia, Broumov Highlights, historic name, now disappeared

Places in Poland

- Gmina Lubrza, Lubusz Voivodeship, known as Liebenau prior to 1945 when the area known as the Neumark was German territory
