= Makowo, Njombe =

Makowo
- ward
- Location in Tanzania
- Coordinates: 09°34′36″S 34°29′21″E
- Country: Tanzania
- Region: Njombe Region
- District: Njombe Urban District
- Time zone: UTC+3 (EAT)
- Postcode: 59112

Makowo is an administrative ward in Njombe Urban District in the Njombe Region of the Tanzanian Southern Highlands. The ward consists of three villages: Mamongolo, Mkowo and Ng'elamo.
