= Makovo, Astrakhan Oblast =

Village in Volodarsky District, Astrakhan Oblast, Russia

Coordinates: 46°10′15″N 048°38′56″E

Makovo (Russian: Маково) is a rural locality (a selo) in Volodarsky District of Astrakhan Oblast, Russia, located in the delta of the Volga River.
