= Iława County =

Iława County Powiat iławski
- County
- Flag Coat of arms

- Location within the voivodeship

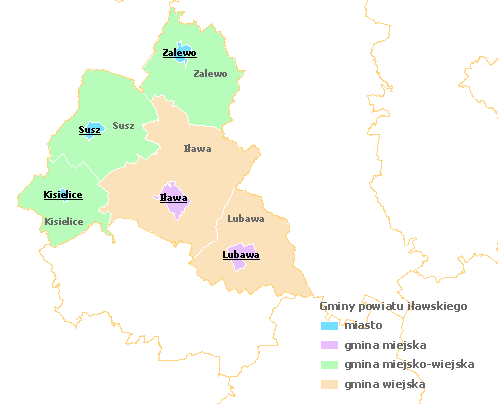
- Division into gminas
- Coordinates (Iława): 53°35′47″N 19°33′56″E
- County: Poland
- Voivodeship: Warmian-Masurian
- Seat: Iława
- Gminas: Total 7 (incl. 2 urban): Iława; Lubawa; Gmina Iława; Gmina Kisielice; Gmina Lubawa; Gmina Susz; Gmina Zalewo

Area
  - Total: 1,385 km^{2} (535 sq mi)

Population (2025)
  - Total: 89,540
  - Density: 64.65/km^{2} (167.4/sq mi)
  - Urban: 51,874
  - Rural: 37,666
- Car plates: NIL
- Website: www.powiat-ilawski.pl

Iława County (Polish: powiat iławski) is a unit of territorial administration and local government (powiat) in Warmian-Masurian Voivodeship, northern Poland.

In the years 1945-1958 it existed under the name Susz County (Polish: powiat suski), subsequently renamed Iława County and abolished along with all powiats of Poland in 1975. Its current incarnation has been reestablished on January 1, 1999, as a result of the Polish local government reforms passed in 1998. Its administrative seat and largest town is Iława, which lies 65 kilometres (40 mi) west of the regional capital Olsztyn. The county contains four other towns: Lubawa, 34 km (21 mi) south of Iława, Susz, 21 km (13 mi) north-west of Iława, Kisielice, 21 km (13 mi) west of Iława, and Zalewo, 28 km (17 mi) north of Iława.

The county covers an area of 1,385 square kilometres (534.8 sq mi). As of 2025 its total population is 89,540, out of which the population of Iława is 32,013, that of Lubawa is 10,670, that of Susz is 5,222, that of Kisielice is 1,983, that of Zalewo is 1,986, and the rural population is 37,666.

== Neighbouring counties ==
Iława County is bordered by Ostróda County to the east, Działdowo County to the south-east, Nowe Miasto County to the south, Grudziądz County and Kwidzyn County to the west, and Sztum County to the north-west.

== Administrative divisions ==
The county is subdivided into seven gminas (two urban, three urban-rural and two rural). These are listed in the following table, in descending order of population.

| Gmina | Type | Area (km^{2}) | Population (2025) | Seat |
|---|---|---|---|---|
| Iława | urban | 21.9 | 32,013 | |
| Gmina Susz | urban-rural | 259.0 | 11,682 | Susz |
| Gmina Iława | rural | 423.6 | 13,278 | Iława * |
| Gmina Lubawa | rural | 236.6 | 10,361 | Lubawa * |
| Lubawa | urban | 16.8 | 10,670 | |
| Gmina Zalewo | urban-rural | 254.3 | 6,067 | Zalewo |
| Gmina Kisielice | urban-rural | 172.8 | 5,469 | Kisielice |
* seat not part of the gmina
