= Former eastern territories of Germany =

Eastern territories lost by Germany after World War II in Europe

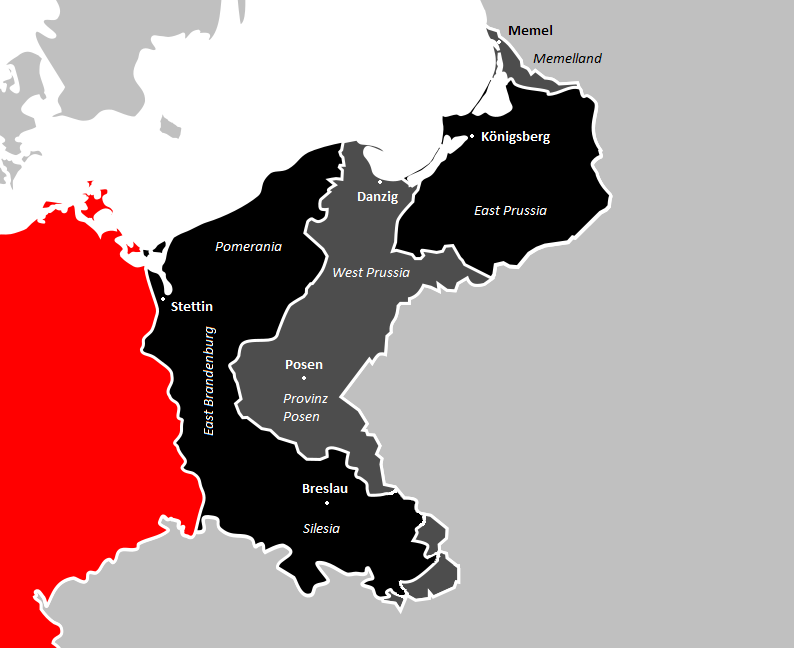
Former eastern territories of Germany Lost in WWI Lost in WWII Remaining since 1945

The former eastern territories of Germany (German: ehemalige deutsche Ostgebiete) refer to those territories east of the current eastern border of Germany, i.e. the Oder–Neisse line, which historically had been considered German and which were annexed by Poland and the Soviet Union after World War II. In contrast to the lands awarded to the restored Polish state by the Treaty of Versailles after World War I, the German territories lost with the post-World War II Potsdam Agreement were either almost exclusively inhabited by Germans before 1945 (the bulk of East Prussia, Lower Silesia, Farther Pomerania, and parts of Western Pomerania, Lusatia, and Neumark), mixed German–Polish with a German majority (the Posen–West Prussia Border March, Lauenburg and Bütow Land, the southern and western rim of East Prussia, Ermland, Western Upper Silesia, and the part of Lower Silesia east of the Oder), or mixed German–Czech with a German majority (Glatz). Virtually the entire German population of the territories that did not flee voluntarily in the face of the Red Army advance of 1945, was violently expelled to the remainder of Germany, with their possessions being forcibly expropriated.

Map showing German territorial losses of 1919 and 1945. 1919 losses are in yellow while 1945 losses are in green and purple.

The ceding of the east German lands to Poland was done in large part to compensate Poland for losing the Kresy lands east of the Curzon line, a region that was annexed by the Soviet Union after it also invaded Poland as part of its agreement with Germany in 1939. This territory had large populations of Ukrainians, Belarusians and Lithuanians – the main ethnic groups of three of the western republics of the Soviet Union – and many towns that were primarily inhabited by Poles and Jews. The Jewish communities in this region were mostly exterminated in the Holocaust and the Polish communities were mostly expelled to the restored Polish state after World War II, the Soviet-ruled Polish People's Republic. Poles from the northern part of Kresy were primarily resettled in Pomerania and Poles from Galicia were primarily resettled in Silesia (institutions like the Ossolineum and the Jan Kazimierz University in Lwów were also relocated, to Wrocław, the former Breslau).

The territories acquired by Poland after World War II are known there as the Recovered Territories. The territories added to Poland had been ruled as part of Poland by the Piast dynasty in the High Middle Ages, with the exception of southern East Prussia, which originally was inhabited by Old Prussians and came under Polish suzerainty in the Late Middle Ages. The northern part of East Prussia was annexed by the Russian Soviet Federative Socialist Republic and became known as the Kaliningrad Oblast. With the transition to the Russian Federation, following the breakdown of the USSR, the region is now a Russian exclave.

The post-war border between Germany and Poland along the Oder–Neisse line was defined in the August 1945 Potsdam Agreement, made between the three main Allies of World War II, the Soviet Union, the United Kingdom, and the United States. It was formally recognized by East Germany in 1950, by the Treaty of Zgorzelec, under pressure from Stalin. In 1952, recognition of the Oder–Neisse line as a permanent boundary was one of Stalin's conditions for the Soviet Union to agree to a reunification of Germany (see Stalin Note). The offer was rejected by Konrad Adenauer, Chancellor of West Germany, at least in part because one of Stalin's other conditions was for Germany to never join NATO (similarly to Austria). The then official West German government position on the status of the former territories of Germany east of the Oder and Neisse rivers was that the areas were "temporarily under Polish [or Soviet] administration", because the border regulation at the Potsdam Conference had been taken as preliminary provisions to be revisited at a final peace conference which, due to the Cold War, had been indefinitely postponed. However, West Germany in 1972 recognised the Oder–Neisse line as the western boundary of Poland when the 1970 Treaty of Warsaw between West Germany and Poland took effect; and in 1973, the Federal Constitutional Court acknowledged the capability of East Germany to negotiate the Treaty of Zgorzelec as an international agreement binding as a legal definition of its boundaries. In signing the Helsinki Final Act in 1975, both West Germany and East Germany (again) recognised the existing boundaries of post-war Europe, including the Oder–Neisse line, as valid and thus permanent under international law.

In 1990, as part of the reunification of Germany, both German countries accepted clauses in the peace treaty with the four countries representing the Allies (Treaty on the Final Settlement With Respect to Germany) to replace the Potsdam Agreement, whereby Germany renounced all claims to territory outside East and West Germany. (Note: The problem with the status of these territories was that in 1945 the concluding document of the Potsdam Conference was not a legally binding treaty, but a memorandum between the USSR, US, and UK. It regulated the issue of the eastern German border, which was to be the Oder–Neisse line, but the final article of the memorandum said that the final decisions concerning Germany were subject to a separate peace treaty. This treaty was signed in 1990 under the name of Treaty on the Final Settlement by both the German states and ratified in 1991 by the united Germany. This ended the legal limbo state which meant that for 45 years, people on both sides of the border could not be sure whether the settlement reached in 1945 might be changed at some future date.) As the result of this treaty, Germany's recognition of the Oder–Neisse line as the border was formalised again by the re-united Germany in the German–Polish Border Treaty on 14 November 1990 and by the repeal of Article 23 of the Basic Law for the Federal Republic of Germany (under which formerly German states outside the Federal Republic could formerly have declared their accession). Germany went from a territory of about 468,787 km^{2} before the 1938 Nazi annexation of Austria to about 357,022 km^{2} after the 1990 reunification of Germany, a loss of 24% or about 111,765 km^{2}. Despite the addition of some formerly German (largely Prussian) territory, Poland's overall territory was reduced by about 20% during WW2 and its aftermath: substantial territories in its east had been lost to the Soviets, these today forming parts of Belarus and Ukraine.

== The territories ==
=== Farther Pomerania and parts of Western Pomerania ===
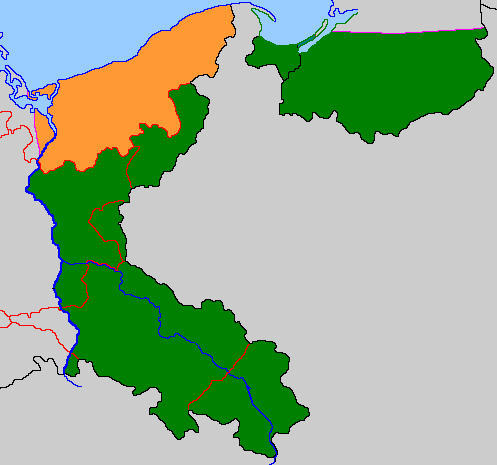
Location of the Province of Pomerania (orange)

Farther Pomerania comprised the eastern part of the Prussian Province of Pomerania. It stretched roughly from the Oder River in the west to Pomerelia in the east, and roughly corresponds to today's Polish West Pomeranian Voivodeship. Along with Farther Pomerania, a small area of Western Pomerania including Stettin (now Szczecin) and Swinemünde (now Świnoujście) was transferred to Poland in 1945.

The Pomeranian parts of the former eastern territories of Germany had been under Polish rule several times from the late 10th century on, when Mieszko I acquired at least significant parts of them. Mieszko's son Bolesław I established a bishopric in the Kołobrzeg area in 1000–1005–07, before the area was lost by Poland again to pagan Slavic tribes.

The Duchy of Pomerania was established as a vassal state of Poland in 1121, which it remained until the fragmentation of Poland after the death of Polish ruler Bolesław III Wrymouth in 1138. The Dukes of Pomerania then became independent, and later were vassals of the Duchy of Saxony from 1164 to 1181, of the Holy Roman Empire from 1181 to 1185, of Denmark from 1185 to 1227 and finally, from 1227 on, were under the Holy Roman Empire (including periods of vassalage to the Margraves of Brandenburg). By the end of the Middle Ages, because of an influx of Germanic settlers, the assimilation of the Slavic population, the introduction of German town law, the influence of Germanic customs, and the trade of the Hanse, the area had been largely Germanized.

Following the Peace of Westphalia in 1648, Farther Pomerania became part of Brandenburg–Prussia. In 1772 the Lauenburg and Bütow Land and the former Starostwo of Draheim were annexed by the King in Prussia and integrated into the Province of Pomerania of the Kingdom of Prussia, though not into the Holy Roman Empire, and did not become part of Germany until being included in the German Confederation in 1815. After the Napoleonic Wars, Swedish Pomerania was merged into the Prussian province in 1815, both now constituting the Province of Pomerania. In 1938, the northern part of the dissolved Grenzmark Posen-West Prussia became part of the province.

At the turn of the 20th century, the total population of the province of almost 1.7 million inhabitants had a Polish-speaking minority of less than 1%.

=== East Brandenburg (Neumark) ===
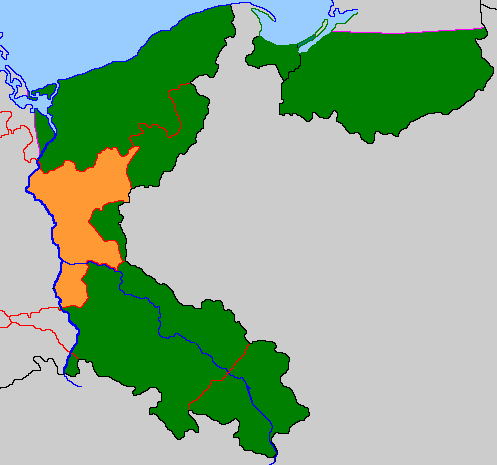
Location of East Brandenburg (orange)

The medieval Lubusz Land, on both sides of the Oder River up to the Spree in the west, including Lubusz (Lebus) itself, also formed part of Mieszko's realm. Poland lost Lubusz when the Silesian duke Bolesław II Rogatka sold it to the Ascanian margraves of Brandenburg in 1249. Brandenburg also acquired the castellany of Santok from Duke Przemysł I of Greater Poland and made it the nucleus of its Neumark ("New March") region. The Bishopric of Lebus remained a suffragan of the Archdiocese of Gniezno until 1424, when it passed under the jurisdiction of the Archbishopric of Magdeburg. The Lubusz Land was part of the Lands of the Bohemian Crown from 1373 to 1415.

=== Silesia, Kłodzko Land and Eastern Lusatia ===
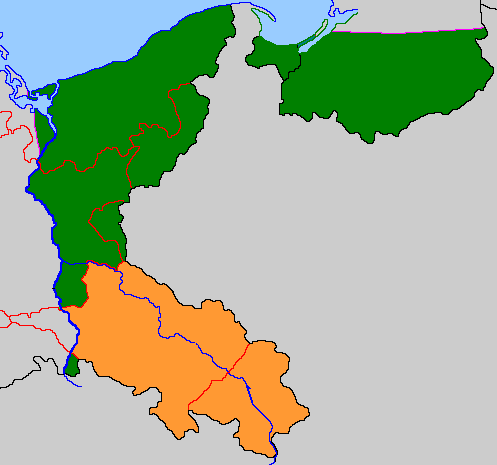
Location of the Province of Silesia (orange)

After Germanic tribes left the area in the Migration Period, Lechitic tribes began to settle Silesia, while Lusatia was settled by the Milceni and the Polabian Slavs and the Kłodzko Land was settled by Bohemians. In the 10th century Mieszko I of Poland made Silesia part of his realm. From the 10th century to the 12th century, Silesia, Lusatia and the Kłodzko Land were contested between Bohemia and Poland. Several independent duchies formed, and eventually some attached themselves to the Kingdom of Bohemia, an electorate of the Holy Roman Empire, while the Kłodzko Land became a constituent part of the kingdom itself. In the 14th century, the Treaty of Namysłów had King Casimir III the Great give up all Polish claims to Silesia and ceded the Duchies of Silesia to the Lands of the Bohemian Crown. Ecclesiastically, the Diocese of Wrocław covering Silesia remained a suffragan of the Polish Archdiocese of Gniezno until becoming exempt in 1821.

The first German colonists arrived in the late 12th century, and large-scale German settlement started in the early 13th century during the reign of Henry I. New forms of agriculture, technology and law brought in by the German settlers, took root in the region, also benefiting the Slavic population. By the late 14th century, 130 towns and 1300 villages had adopted German law. Silesian cities such as Jelenia Góra (Hirschberg), Lwówek Śląski (Löwenberg) and Złotoryja (Goldberg) had typical architecture, being centered around a central square, the ring, which became known in Polish as rynek. German craftsmen and miners also started settling the region's mountainous areas.

The Bohemian Lands were under the rule of the House of Jagiellon in personal union with the Kingdom of Hungary until the Battle of Mohács in 1526. Afterwards, they were ruled in personal union with the Kingdom of Hungary and the Archduchy of Austria by the Holy Roman Emperors of the House of Habsburg, finally ceasing de facto (but not de jure) to exist as a separate realm and becoming a part of the Habsburg monarchy in the aftermath of the Bohemian Revolt's defeat in the Battle of White Mountain. After losing the 18th-century Silesian Wars, the Habsburg monarchy was forced to cede most of the region to the Kingdom of Prussia in the treaties of Breslau and of Berlin, retaining only Austrian Silesia. The ceded lands also included the (sometimes considered Moravian) territories of the Duchies of Troppau and of Krnov north of the Opava river, as well as the strategically important Kłodzko Land, a part of the core territory of the Kingdom of Bohemia.

As the result of the peaceful influx of German-speakers, Lusatia, Silesia and the Kłodzko Land became predominantly German-speaking. Czech continued to be spoken in parts of Austrian Silesia, in the Hlučín Region of Upper Silesia and in the western part of the Kłodzko Land (Czech Corner). Sorbian was spoken in parts of Lusatia, while Polish prevailed in Middle Silesia north of the Oder river, in parts of Austrian Silesia and in Upper Silesia. In the latter case, the Germans who arrived during the Middle Ages became mostly Polonised, especially with the advent of the industrial revolution which created employment and business opportunities, attracting numerous Poles to the area. In contrast the Polish-speaking parts of Lower and Middle Silesia, commonly described until the late 19th century as the Polish side, were mostly Germanised in the 18th and 19th centuries, except for a few patches and a larger area along the northeastern frontier.

=== East Prussia, including Warmia, and the Klaipėda Region ===
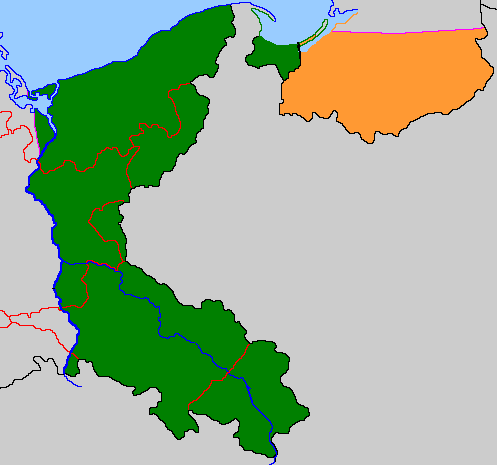
Location of southern part of the Province of East Prussia (orange)

Originally inhabited mainly by the pagan Old Prussians, the regions were conquered and incorporated into the state of the Teutonic Knights in the 13th and 14th centuries. Under the Teutonic Order, the region's towns were founded, woodlands were cleared and marshlands made arable to be settled by colonists, predominantly from German-speaking areas but also from neighboring Polish and Lithuanian lands. The area became predominantly German during the Ostsiedlung, either almost exclusively (Sambia, Natangia, and Bartia together forming the central part of the region), mixed German-Lithuanian (the North-Eastern part called Lithuania Minor including Sudovia, Nadrovia and Scalovia), or mixed German–Polish (Masurians, Warmiacy) comprising the southern (Sasna and Galindia, together forming Masuria) and western (Warmia, Pomesania, and Pogesania, the latter two together forming Powiśle) rim of the region. By the Second Peace of Thorn (1466), Warmia and the Malbork Land (comprising northern parts of Pomesania and Pogesania) became subject to the Polish Crown as a part of Royal Prussia, a region initially holding considerable autonomy and continuing to use the German language as official, but ultimately becoming fully integrated with the Crown of Poland upon conclusion of the Union of Lublin. Masuria and the southern part of Pomesania and Pogesania stayed part of the rump Teutonic state (called thereafter Monastic Prussia or Teutonic Prussia) which became a German fief of the Polish–Lithuanian Commonwealth, finally secularised in 1525 to become the Ducal Prussia. The latter later emancipated, taking advantage of the Russo-Swedish Deluge, and merged with the Electorate of Brandenburg to form Brandenburg–Prussia, shortly thereafter becoming a kingdom. Subsequently, it entered into an alliance with Austria and Russia, invading Polish territories of Royal Prussia in the First Partition of Poland (1772), with Warmia being made part of the newly formed province of East Prussia in 1773. As a result of the Treaty of Versailles, a minor part around Soldau was transferred to Poland, the Klaipėda Region formed a free city supervised by the League of Nations, annexed following the Klaipėda Revolt by Lithuania but reclaimed by Germany in 1938, while the bulk (including entire Warmia and Masuria) remained a part of Germany, following the East Prussian plebiscite, and became enlarged by the addition of the formerly West Prussian Malbork Land.

== Other uses and definitions of the term ==
In the Potsdam Agreement the description of the territories transferred is "The former German territories east of the Oder–Neisse line", and permutations on this description are the most commonly used to describe any former territories of interwar Germany east of the Oder–Neisse line.

The term has sometimes been confused with the name East Germany, a political term, used to be the common colloquial English name for the German Democratic Republic (GDR), and mirrored the common colloquial English term for the other German state of West Germany. When focusing on the period before World War II, "eastern Germany" is used to describe all the territories east of the Elbe (East Elbia), as reflected in the works of sociologist Max Weber and political theorist Carl Schmitt, but because of the border changes in the 20th century, after World War II the term "East Germany" and eastern Germany in English has meant the territory of the German Democratic Republic.

In German, only one corresponding term Ostdeutschland exists, meaning both East Germany and Eastern Germany. The rather ambiguous German term never gained as widespread use for the GDR during its existence, as did the English designation, or the derived demonym Ossi (Eastie), and only following the German reunification has it started to be commonly used to denote both the historic post-war German Democratic Republic, and its counterpart five successor states in the current reunited Germany. However, because people and institutions in the states traditionally considered as Middle Germany, like the three southern new states Saxony-Anhalt, the Free State of Saxony and the Free State of Thuringia, still use the term Middle Germany when referring to their area and its institutions, the term Ostdeutschland is still ambiguous.

== Historical outline ==
=== Early history, Kingdom of Poland, Teutonic Order State, Lands of the Bohemian Crown and the Holy Roman Empire ===
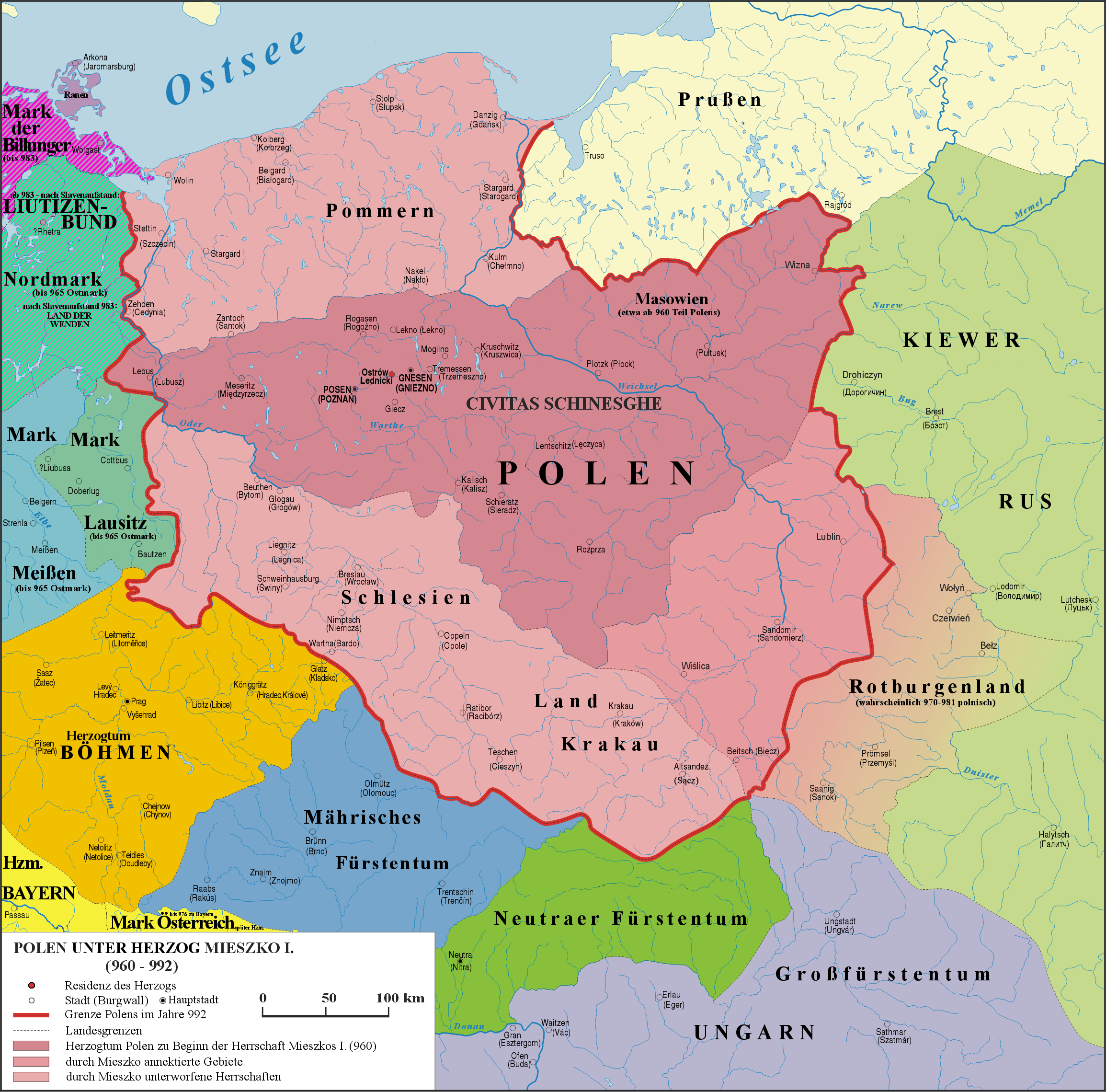
Map of Poland under Duke Mieszko I, whose conversion to Christianity and recognition by the Papacy, marked the beginning of Polish statehood in 966 AD

As various Germanic tribes had left present-day Poland and East Germany, West Slavic tribes moved to these places from the 6th century onward. Duke Mieszko I of the Polans, from his stronghold in the Gniezno area, united various neighboring tribes in the second half of the 10th century, formed the first Polish state and became the first historically recorded Piast duke. His realm bordered the German state, and control over the borderlands would shift back and forth between the two polities over the centuries to come.

Mieszko's son and successor, king Bolesław I Chrobry, upon the 1018 Peace of Bautzen expanded the southern part of the realm but lost control over the lands of Western Pomerania on the Baltic coast. After pagan revolts and a Bohemian invasion in the 1030s, Duke Casimir I the Restorer (reigned 1040–1058) again united most of the former Piast realm, including Silesia and Lubusz Land, on both sides of the middle Oder River but without Western Pomerania, which returned to of the Polish state only under Bolesław III Wrymouth from 1116 to 1121, when the noble House of Griffins established the Duchy of Pomerania. On Bolesław's death in 1138, Poland was for almost 200 years was subjected to fragmentation and ruled by Bolesław's sons and by their successors, who were often in conflict with one another. Władysław I the Elbow-high, who was crowned king of Poland in 1320, achieved a partial reunification, but the Silesian and Masovian duchies remained independent Piast holdings.

In the 12th to the 14th centuries, German settlers, most of whom spoke Low German, moved into Central and Eastern Europe in a migration process known as the Ostsiedlung, and the Hanseatic League dominated the shores of the Baltic Sea. In Pomerania, Brandenburg, East Prussia, Lusatia, Kłodzko Land and Lower Silesia, the former West Slav (Bohemians, Polabian Slavs and Poles) or Baltic population became minorities in the course of the following centuries, but substantial numbers of them remained in areas such as Upper Silesia. In Greater Poland and in Eastern Pomerania (Pomerelia), German settlers always remained a minority. Some of the territories, such as Pomerelia and Masovia, reunited with Poland during the 15th and 16th centuries. Silesia, Lubusz Land and Lusatia (as parts of the Lands of the Bohemian Crown) and the Duchy of Pomerania became more firmly incorporated into the Holy Roman Empire.

=== Partitions of Poland, Kingdom of Prussia, Duchy of Warsaw, Austrian Empire, Grand Duchy of Posen and German Confederation ===
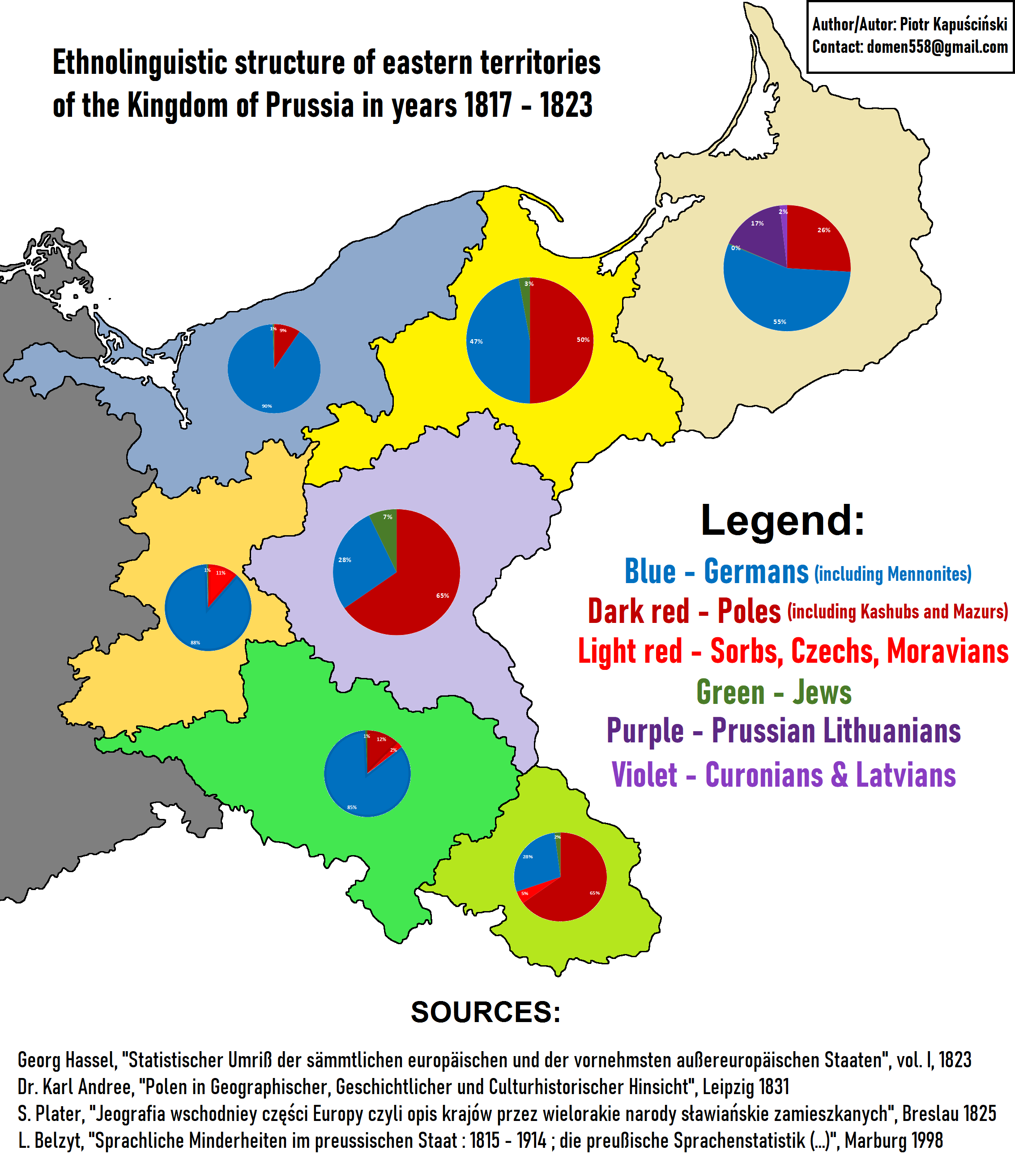
Ethnic structure of the eastern regions of Prussia in 1817–1823

In the course of the Partitions of Polish–Lithuanian Commonwealth, the Kingdom of Prussia and the Austrian Empire acquired vast territorial shares of the demised Polish–Lithuanian Commonwealth. During the Napoleonic era the Greater Polish territories and the Chełmno Land formed part of the Duchy of Warsaw following the Treaties of Tilsit, and Danzig was granted a status of a Free City. However, after the Congress of Vienna, the Polish duchy was again partitioned between Russia and Prussia. The Congress of Vienna established as a replacement for the dissolved Holy Roman Empire the German Confederation (German: Deutscher Bund), an association of 39 German-speaking states in Central Europe under the nominal leadership of the Austrian Empire. Its boundaries largely followed the ones of its predecessor, the Holy Roman Empire, defining the territory of Germany for much of the 19th century and confirming Pomerania, East Brandenburg and Silesia as its parts. On the other hand, the remaining parts of the lands ruled by the House of Hohenzollern which were not included in the Holy Roman Empire, namely the German-speaking Prussian nucleus (East Prussia), and the newly acquired predominantly Polish- or Kashubian-speaking territorial share of the collapsed and dismembered Polish–Lithuanian Commonwealth (Grand Duchy of Posen and West Prussia), continued as external to the Confederation (a failed attempt to include these lands in the German Empire (1848–49) was undertaken by the Frankfurt Parliament), as did the Austrian-held partition of Poland (the Kingdom of Galicia and Lodomeria), Transleithania, as well as the German-speaking cantons of Switzerland and the French region of Alsace.

=== North German Confederation, German Empire, and Austria–Hungary ===
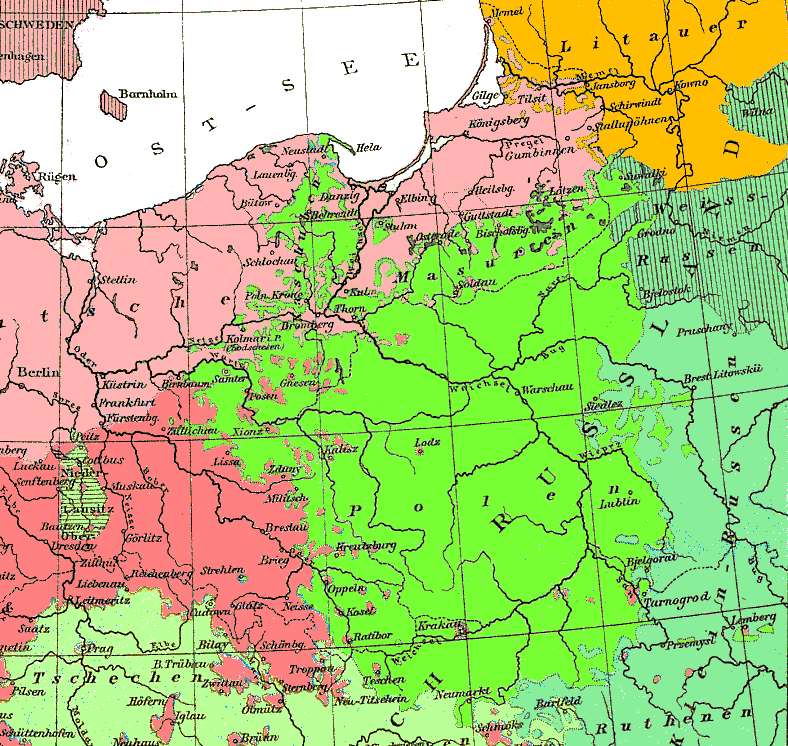
German atlas from 1880 showing the spread of languages

In the following years, Prussia superseded Austria in the role of the primary driving force of the restoration of German unity and secured this position by abolishing the German Confederation in the Peace of Prague. Austria was in turn transformed into poly-ethnic Austria-Hungary, abstained from further German unification efforts and abandoned forced Germanization.

Thus, the planned German unification was to be accomplished in the Lesser German solution version. With rise of nationalism, the eastern Hohenzollern-ruled territories with a predominantly Polish population (especially the formerly Polish territories of Posen and West Prussia) increasingly became a target of aggressive Germanisation efforts, German settlement, anti-Catholic campaigns (Kulturkampf), as well as disfranchisement and expropriations of Poles, and finally annexed following the North German Confederation Treaty (1866). At the time of German Unification in 1871, the Kingdom of Prussia was the largest and dominant part of the North German Confederation, the predecessor of the newly formed German Empire.

=== Weimar Republic, Second Polish Republic, First Czechoslovak Republic, Free City of Danzig, and Klaipėda Region ===
German territorial losses after the Treaty of Versailles

The Treaty of Versailles of 1919, which ended the war, restored the independence of Poland, known as the Second Polish Republic, and Germany was compelled to cede territories to it, most of which were taken by Prussia in the three Partitions of Poland and had been part of the Kingdom of Prussia and later the German Empire for the 100 years of the non-existence of Polish state. The territories retroceded to Poland in 1919 were those with a Polish majority, such as Greater Poland, as well as Pomerelia, historically the part of Poland providing its access to the sea. Restoration of Pomerelia to Poland meant the loss of Germany's territorial contiguousness to East Prussia making it an exclave.

Most of the eastern territories with a predominantly or almost exclusively German population (East Brandenburg, East Prussia, Hither and Farther Pomerania, and the bulk of Silesia) remained with Germany. The historically Polish and strategically vital for Poland but predominantly German-speaking city of Danzig formed henceforth with its surrounding areas the Free City of Danzig, a self-governing territory supervised by the League of Nations, albeit bound in some aspects by an imposed union with Poland.

However, in areas such as Upper Silesia, no clear division between the mostly bilingual population was possible. After a first plebiscite, Upper Silesia was to stay part of Germany's territory. However, after the Silesian Uprisings, the area was divided in accord with the German–Polish Convention regarding Upper Silesia.

The parts of the former province of Posen and of West Prussia that were not restored as part of the Second Polish Republic were administered as Grenzmark Posen-Westpreußen (the German Province of Posen–West Prussia) until 1939.

==== Division of Germany's eastern provinces after 1918 ====
Division of Posen, Prussian Silesia, West Prussia and East Prussia after World War I
From province:	Area in 1910	Share of territory	Population in 1910	After WW1 part of:	Notes
West Prussia	25,580 km^{2}	100%	1.703.474	Divided between:	
to Poland	15,900 km^{2}	62%	57%	Pomeranian Voivodeship	(Note: Poland received several cities and counties of West Prussia located east of the Vistula: Lubawa, Brodnica, Wąbrzeźno, Toruń, Chełmno, Grudziądz; as well as most of cities and counties of West Prussia located west of it: Świecie, Tuchola, Starogard Gdański, Kwidzyn (only part west of the Vistula), most of county Tczew, eastern part of county Złotów, part of county Człuchów, as well as counties Chojnice, Kościerzyna, Kartuzy, coastal Wejherowo and Puck with Gdynia; as well as a small-western part of Danziger Höhe and areas around Janowo east of the Vistula.)
to Free City Danzig	1,966 km^{2}	8%	19%	Free City of Danzig	
to East Prussia (within Weimar Germany)	2,927 km^{2}	11%	15%	Region of West Prussia	(Note: Parts of West Prussia east of Nogat and Vistula rivers which remained in Germany after 1918, including the city and the county of Elbląg and Malbork (part east of Nogat), Sztum, Kwidzyn (only part east of the Vistula) and Susz Counties, were incorporated to East Prussia as the Regency of West Prussia. The area of historical Pomesania had a significant Polish minority.)
to Germany	4,787 km^{2}	19%	9%	Posen-West Prussia	(Note: Western part of West Prussia with county Wałcz and parts of counties Złotów and Człuchów (the latter two split between Poland and Germany). This area included 12 towns and cities: Człuchów, Debrzno, Biały Bór, Czarne, Lędyczek, Złotów, Krajenka, Wałcz, Mirosławiec, Człopa, Tuczno and Jastrowie. The area was home to significant Polish minority.)
East Prussia	37,002 km^{2}	100%	2.064.175	Divided between:	
to Poland	565 km^{2}	2%	2%	Pomeranian Voivodeship (Soldauer Ländchen)	(Note: Part of pre-1918 Nidzica County with Działdowo and with around 27,000 inhabitants; as well as parts of Ostróda County near Dąbrówno, with areas around Groszki, Lubstynek, Napromek, Czerlin, Lewałd Wielki, Grzybiny and with around 4786 inhabitants. Too small to form its own voivodeship, this territory was incorporated to intewar Pomeranian Voivodeship.)
to Lithuania	2,828 km^{2}	8%	7%	Klaipėda Region	
to East Prussia (within Weimar Germany)	33,609 km^{2}	90%	91%	East Prussia	
Posen	28,992 km^{2}	100%	2.099.831	Divided between:	
to Poland	26,111 km^{2}	90%	93%	Poznań Voivodeship	
to Germany	2,881 km^{2}	10%	7%	Posen–West Prussia	(Note: Western fringes of Prussian Greater Poland, which remained in Germany after 1918. The area included the entire Skwierzyna County as well as portions of Wschowa, Babimost, Międzyrzecz, Chodzież, Wieleń and Czarnków Counties (Netzekreis). It contained 12 towns and cities: Piła, Skwierzyna, Bledzew, Wschowa, Szlichtyngowa, Babimost, Kargowa, Międzyrzecz, Zbąszyń, Brójce, Trzciel and Trzcianka. The area was home to significant Polish minority.)
Lower Silesia	27,105 km^{2}	100%	3.017.981	Divided between:	
to Poland	527 km^{2}	2%	1%	Poznań Voivodeship (Niederschlesiens Ostmark)	(Note: After World War I, Poland received a small part of historical Lower Silesia, with majority-Polish population as of 1918. That area included parts of counties Syców (German: Polnisch Wartenberg), Namysłów, Góra and Milicz. In total around 527 square kilometers with around 30 thousand inhabitants, including the city of Rychtal. Too small to form its own voivodeship, the area was incorporated to Poznań Voivodeship (former Province of Posen).)
to Germany	26,578 km^{2}	98%	99%	Province of Lower Silesia	
Upper Silesia	13,230 km^{2}	100%	2.207.981	Divided between:	
to Poland	3,225 km^{2}	25%	41%	Silesian Voivodeship	(Note: Interwar Silesian Voivodeship was formed from Prussian East Upper Silesia (area 3,225 km^{2}) and Polish part of Austrian Cieszyn Silesia (1,010 km^{2}), in total 4,235 km^{2}. After the annexation of Trans-Olza from Czechoslovakia in 1938, it increased to 5,122 km^{2}. Silesian Voivodeship's capital was Katowice.)
to Czechoslovakia	325 km^{2}	2%	2%	Hlučín Region	
to Germany	9,680 km^{2}	73%	57%	Province of Upper Silesia	
Total	131,909 km^{2}	100%	11.093.442	Divided between:	
to Poland	46,328 km^{2}	35%	35%	Second Polish Republic	(Note: All in all, the post-Prussian part of Poland had ca. 4 million inhabitants immediately after the Great War – ca. 2 million from Province of Posen, ca. 1 million from West Prussia and ca. 1 million from Upper Silesia, plus 60,000 from Lower Silesia and East Prussia.)
to Lithuania	2,828 km^{2}	2%	2%	Klaipėda Region	
to Free City Danzig	1,966 km^{2}	2%	3%	Free City of Danzig	
to Czechoslovakia	325 km^{2}	0%	0%	Czech Silesia	
to Germany	80,462 km^{2}	61%	60%	Free State of Prussia	

=== Nazi Germany ===
The defeat of Germany and the imposed terms of peace left a sense of injustice among the population. The subsequent interwar economic crisis acted as a fertile ground for irredentist claims that the territory ceded to Poland, Czechoslovakia and Lithuania in 1919–1922 should be returned to Germany, which paved the way for the Nazi takeover of the government.

In October 1938, Hlučín Region of Moravian-Silesian Region, which had been ceded to Czechoslovakia under the Treaty of Versailles, was annexed by the Third Reich as a part of areas lost by Czechoslovakia under the Munich Agreement. However, as distinct from other lost Czechoslovak domains, it was not attached to Sudetengau (the administrative region covering the Sudetenland) but to Prussia (Upper Silesia).

By late 1938, Lithuania had lost control over the situation in the Memel Territory, which had been annexed by Lithuania in the Klaipėda Revolt. In the early hours of 23 March 1939, after a political ultimatum caused a Lithuanian delegation to travel to Berlin, Lithuanian Foreign Minister Juozas Urbšys and German Foreign Minister Joachim von Ribbentrop signed the Treaty of the Cession of the Memel Territory to Germany in exchange for a Lithuanian Free Zone in the port of Memel that used the facilities erected in the previous years.

In the interwar period, the German administration, both Weimar and Nazi, conducted a massive campaign of renaming of thousands of placenames, to remove traces of Polish, Lithuanian and Old Prussian origin.

=== Second World War and the German occupation of Poland, 1939–1945 ===
Germany invaded Poland without a declaration of war on 1 September 1939, heralding the start of the Second World War. The Third Reich at first annexed the lands of the Second Polish Republic up to the Congress of Vienna borders (1815–1918). After Hitler's call for an international peace conference on Poland's borders in his 6 October 1939 Reichstag speech was rejected by both Édouard Daladier and Neville Chamberlain, another stripe of Polish lands was annexed.

All annexed territories comprised Pomerelia (the "Polish Corridor"), Chełmno Land, Greater Poland proper, Kuyavia, Łęczyca Land, Sieradz Land, Northern Masovia, as well as the parts of Upper Silesia located in Poland, including the former Czechoslovak part of Cieszyn Silesia annexed by Poland in 1938. The Senate of the Free City of Danzig, elected by the Volkstag already also dominated by the Nazi Party at that time, voted to become a part of Germany again, but Poles and Jews were deprived of their voting rights and all non-Nazi political parties were banned.

Two decrees by Adolf Hitler (8 and 12 October 1939) divided the annexed areas of Poland into administrative units:

- Reichsgau Wartheland (initially Reichsgau Posen), which included the entire Poznań Voivodeship, most of the Łódź Voivodeship, five counties of the Pomeranian Voivodeship, and one county of the Warszawa Voivodeship;
- Reichsgau Danzig-West Prussia (initially Reichsgau West Prussia), which consisted of the remaining area of the Pomeranian Voivodeship and the Free City of Danzig;
- Ciechanów District (Regierungsbezirk Zichenau), consisting of the five northern counties of Warszawa Voivodeship (Płock, Płońsk, Sierpc, Ciechanów, and Mława), which became a part of East Prussia;
- Katowice District (Regierungsbezirk Kattowitz), or East Upper Silesia (Ost-Oberschlesien), which included Sosnowiec, Będzin, Chrzanów, and Zawiercie Counties, and parts of Olkusz and Żywiec Counties.

The territories had an area of 94,000 km^{2} and a population of 10,000,000. Throughout the war, the annexed Polish territories were subject to German colonisation. Because of the lack of settlers from Germany itself, the colonists were primarily ethnic Germans relocated from other parts of Eastern Europe. The ethnic Germans were then resettled in homes from which the Poles had been expelled.

The remainder of Polish territory was annexed by the Soviet Union (see Molotov–Ribbentrop Pact) or made into the German-controlled General Government occupation zone.

After the German attack on the Soviet Union in June 1941, the district of Białystok, which included the Białystok, Bielsk Podlaski, Grajewo, Łomża, Sokółka, Volkovysk and Grodno counties, was "attached to" but not incorporated into East Prussia, and Eastern Galicia (District of Galicia), which included the cities of Lwów, Stanislawów and Tarnopol, was made part of the General Government.

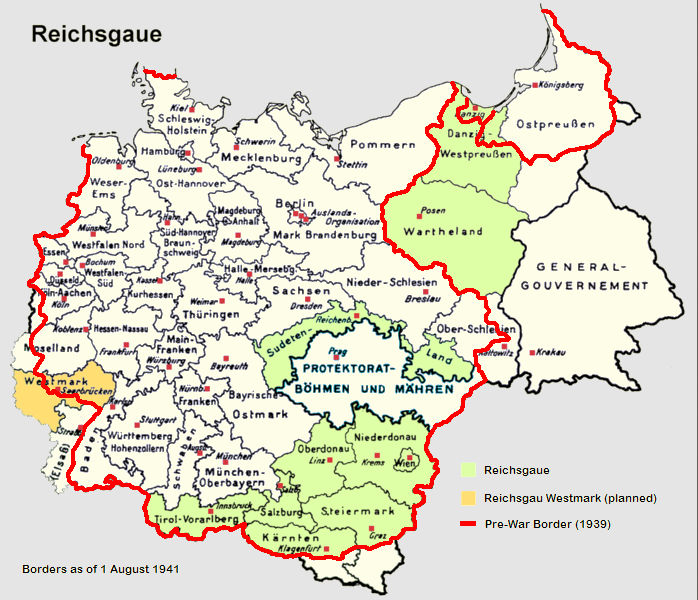
Map of Reichsgaue in 1941

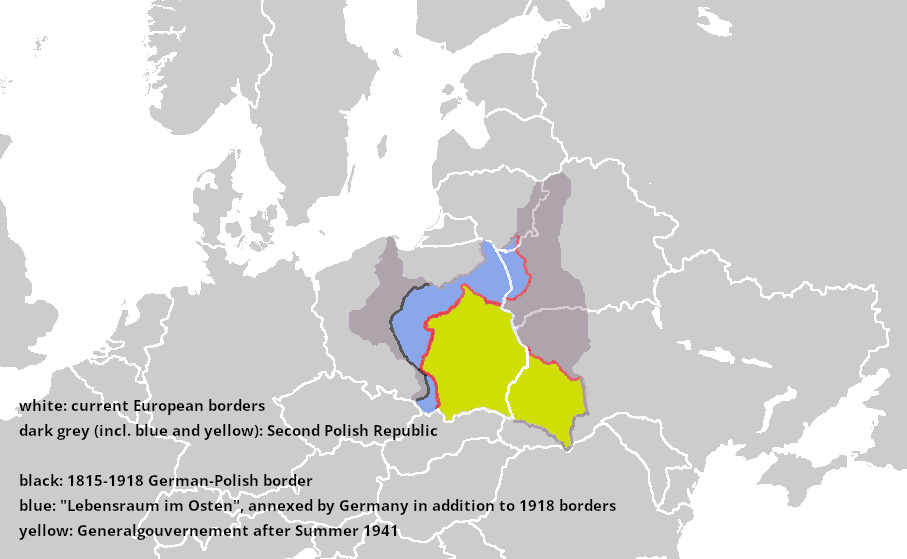
1941 Map of Generalgouvernement (yellow) in comparison to Second Polish Republic (dark grey, blue, yellow), today's borders (white), 1918 German-Polish border (black), and in blue areas annexed by Nazi Germany in addition to the Congress of Vienna borders (1815–1918)

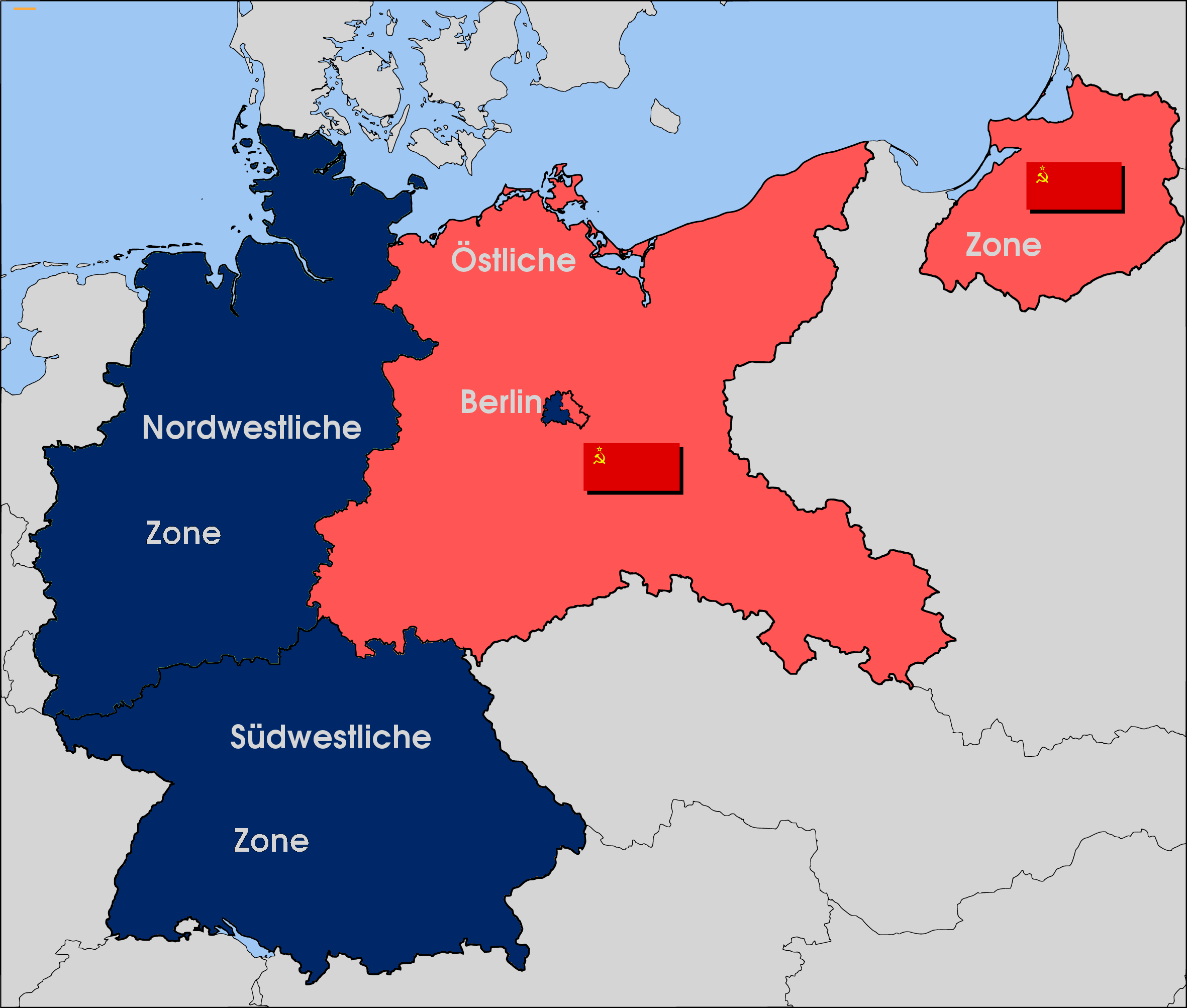
Planning of occupation zone borders in Germany, 1944

=== Yalta Conference ===
The final decision to move Poland's boundary westward was made by the United States, the United Kingdom and the Soviet Union at the Yalta Conference in February 1945, shortly before the end of the war. The precise location of the border was left open, and the western Allies also accepted in general the principles of the Oder River being the future western border of Poland and of population transfer being the way to prevent future border disputes. The open questions were whether the border should follow the Eastern or Lusatian Neisse rivers and whether Stettin, the traditional seaport of Berlin, should remain in Germany or be included in Poland.

Originally, Germany was to retain Stettin, and the Poles were to annex all of East Prussia with Königsberg. Eventually, however, Stalin decided to keep Königsberg for strategic grounds (it would also be a year-round warm-water port for the Soviet Navy) and argued that the Poles should receive Stettin instead. The wartime Polish government-in-exile had little say in the decisions.

The Yalta Conference agreed to split Germany into four occupation zones after the war. The status of Poland was discussed but this was complicated by the fact that Poland was then controlled by the Red Army. The conference agreed to reorganise the Provisionary Polish Government, which had been set up by the Red Army, by the inclusion of some politicians of the Polish government-in-exile, and to transform it into the Provisional Government of National Unity, with an unfulfilled promise to hold democratic and fair elections. That effectively ended the international recognition of the Polish government-in-exile, which had been evacuated in 1939. The conference agreed that the Polish eastern border would follow the Curzon Line and that Poland would receive substantial territorial compensation in the west from Germany, but the exact border was to be determined later. A "Committee on Dismemberment of Germany" was to be set up to decide whether Germany was to be divided into six nations and, if so, what borders and interrelations the new German states would have.

To pressure the Western Allies regarding the verbal commitments of Tehran and Yalta, the Soviets began transferring regions east of the Oder–Neisse line to Polish control, although these areas were still officially part of the Soviet occupation zone of Germany. The US government strongly protested to the unilateral implementation of a Polish government in these areas.

=== Potsdam Agreement, 1945 ===
Occupied Germany in 1947. Territories east of the Oder–Neisse line were annexed by Poland and the Soviet Union under the terms of the Potsdam Agreement.

After World War II, several memoranda of the US State Department warned against awarding Poland such extensive lands, apprehensive of creation of new long-standing tension in the area. In particular, the State Department acknowledged that Polish claims to Lower Silesia had no ethnic or historic justification.

Under Stalin's pressure, the Potsdam Conference, held from 17 July until 2 August 1945, placed all of the areas east of the Oder–Neisse line, whether recognised by the international community as part of Germany until 1939 or occupied by Germany during World War II, under the jurisdiction of other countries, pending a final Peace Conference.

The Allies also agreed that:

XII. Orderly transfer of German populations. The Three Governments [of the Soviet Union, the United States and Great Britain], having considered the question in all its aspects, recognize that the transfer to Germany of German populations, or elements thereof, remaining in Poland, Czechoslovakia and Hungary, will have to be undertaken. They agree that any transfers that take place should be effected in an orderly and humane manner.

because in the words of Winston Churchill

Expulsion is the method which, in so far as we have been able to see, will be the most satisfactory and lasting. There will be no mixture of populations to cause endless trouble. A clean sweep will be made.

The problem with the status of these territories was that the Potsdam Agreement was not a legally binding treaty, but a memorandum between the USSR, the US and the UK (to which neither France, nor Germany or Poland were party). It regulated the issue of the eastern German border, which was confirmed as being along the Oder–Neisse line, but the final article of the memorandum said that the final decisions concerning Germany, and hence the detailed alignment of Germany's eastern boundaries, would be subject to a separate peace treaty; at which the three Allied signatories committed themselves to respect the terms of the Potsdam memorandum. Hence, so long as these Allied Powers remained committed to the Potsdam protocols, without German agreement to an Oder–Neisse line boundary there could be no peace treaty and no German reunification. The debate affected Cold War politics and diplomacy and played an important role in the negotiations leading up to the reunification of Germany in 1990.

=== Expulsion of Germans and resettlement ===
Map showing Poland's borders pre-1938 and post-1945. The Eastern Borderlands is in gray while the Recovered Territories are in pink.

With the rapid advance of the Red Army in the winter of 1944–1945, German authorities desperately evacuated many Germans westwards. The majority of the remaining German-speaking population in the territory of former Czechoslovakia and east of the Oder–Neisse line (roughly 10 million in the Ostgebiete alone), that had not already been evacuated, was expelled by the new Czech and Polish administrations. Although in the post-war period earlier German sources often cited the number of evacuated and expelled Germans as 16 million and the death toll as between 1.7 and 2.5 million, those numbers are today considered by some historians to be exaggerated and the death toll more likely in a range between 400,000 and 600,000. Some present-day estimates place the numbers of German refugees at 14 million, of whom about half a million died during the evacuations and expulsions.

At the same time, Poles from central Poland, expelled Poles from former eastern Poland, Polish returnees from internment and forced labour, Ukrainians forcibly resettled in Operation Vistula, and Jewish Holocaust survivors were settled in German territories gained by Poland, whereas the north of former East Prussia (Kaliningrad Oblast gained by the USSR) was turned into a military zone and subsequently settled with Russians. The first Polish settlers in contrast experienced complete alienation from their new surroundings, perceived as fully foreign and German.

However, contrary to the official declaration that the former German inhabitants of the Recovered Territories had to be removed quickly to house Poles displaced by the Soviet annexation, the new Polish lands initially faced a severe population shortage.

Polish population transfers from the Soviet Union only amounted for 1.5 million people, while more than 8 million Germans lost their homes in the German Eastern Territories.

=== Polonization and the Treaty of Zgorzelec ===
Drawing from interwar demands by Polish nationalists (albeit far more limited), Poland's sweeping territorial gains of German land were presented as inspired by the Piast vision of an ethnically homogeneous state within the borders of medieval Piast Poland. Fully German-speaking areas such as Lower Silesia and Farther Pomerania suffered expulsion of its entire indigenous population in 1945–46. Polonization proceeded rapidly, despite the still uncertain border.

Rather than taking over German place names, new Polish place names were determined by decree, reverting to a Slavic name or inventing a new name for places founded by German speakers. In order to establish the Piast vision in the consciousness of the population and to convince them of the historical justice of the annexation of the former German territories, the 'Recovered Territories' were covered with a network of designations connected with the Piast dynasty, even if the buildings themselves had no reference to the Piast rulers.

The Polish Communists mobilized for cleansing and acculturation to de-Germanize their new home. German words were removed from buildings and even from art works, dishes, and gravesites. Meanwhile, a blatantly fraudulent referendum was held on three different questions; the third of these was whether the Polish people were in favor of the new western border. According to the official results, over 90% voted "yes" despite Poland having lost substantial territories in the east (the Kresy lands) as well.

The process was finalized in 1950 by the Treaty of Zgorzelec, an agreement signed under Soviet pressure by Otto Grotewohl, prime minister of the provisional government of the GDR (East Germany) and Polish premier Józef Cyrankiewicz. It recognized the Oder–Neisse line specified by the 1945 Potsdam Agreement as the border between the two states. The terms referred to the "defined and existing border" from the Baltic Sea west of Świnoujście – however without mentioning Szczecin – along the Oder and Lusatian Neisse rivers to the Czechoslovak border.

=== West German politics in the early post-World-War-II years ===
After the war, the so-called "German question", named after the 19th-century debate on German reunification, was an important factor of post-war German and European history and politics.

Between 1949 and 1970 the government of West Germany referred to these territories as "former German territories temporarily under Polish and Soviet administration". This terminology was used in relation to territories of eastern Germany within the 1937 Germany border, and was based on the terminology used in the Potsdam Agreement. It was used only by the Federal Republic of Germany; but the Polish and Soviet governments objected to the obvious implication that these territories should someday revert to Germany. The Polish government preferred to use the phrase Recovered Territories, asserting a sort of continuity because parts of these territories had centuries previously been ruled by ethnic Poles.

Until 1973, the Federal Republic took a strict line in claiming an exclusive mandate for all of Germany. Under the Hallstein Doctrine, the Federal Republic broke diplomatic relations with states that maintained diplomatic relations with the GDR, except for the Soviet Union. Therefore, the government of West Germany and the Bundestag declared in 1950 the Treaty of Zgorzelec ″null and void″.

In the early history of West Germany, refugee organizations were an important political factor, demanding that Germany never renounce the land that was deemed still part of Germany. However, contrary to the official claims, the bulk of the expelleés would likely have no real intention of returning to their homeland.

=== Ostpolitik and the Treaty of Warsaw ===
In the 1970s, West Germany adopted Ostpolitik in foreign relations, which strove to normalise relations with its neighbours by recognising the realities of the European order of the time, and abandoning elements of the Hallstein Doctrine. West Germany also abandoned for the time being its claims with respect to German reunification, recognising the existence of the German Democratic Republic (GDR); and the validity of the Oder–Neisse line in international law." As part of this new approach, West Germany concluded friendship treaties with the Soviet Union (Treaty of Moscow (1970)), Poland (Treaty of Warsaw (1970)), East Germany (Basic Treaty (1972)) and Czechoslovakia (Treaty of Prague (1973)); and participated in the Helsinki Final Act (1975). The validity of the Treaty of Zgorzelec was explicitly confirmed in a judgement of the Federal Constitutional Court of 1973 on the Basic Treaty between East and West Germany. Nevertheless, West Germany continued its long-term objective of achieving a reunification of East Germany, West Germany and Berlin; and maintained that its formal recognition of the post-war boundaries of Germany would need to be confirmed by a united Germany in the context of a Final Settlement of the Second World War. Some West German commentators continued to maintain that neither the Treaty of Zgorzelec nor the Treaty of Warsaw should be considered as binding on a future united Germany; albeit that these reservations were intended for domestic political consumption, and the arguments advanced in support of them had no substance in international law.

The Holy See immediately acknowledged the new reality following the Treaty of Warsaw, and created new Polish dioceses in the territories with the papal bulls Episcoporum Poloniae coetus and Vratislaviensis – Berolinensis et aliarium.

=== German reunification and German–Polish Border Treaty ===
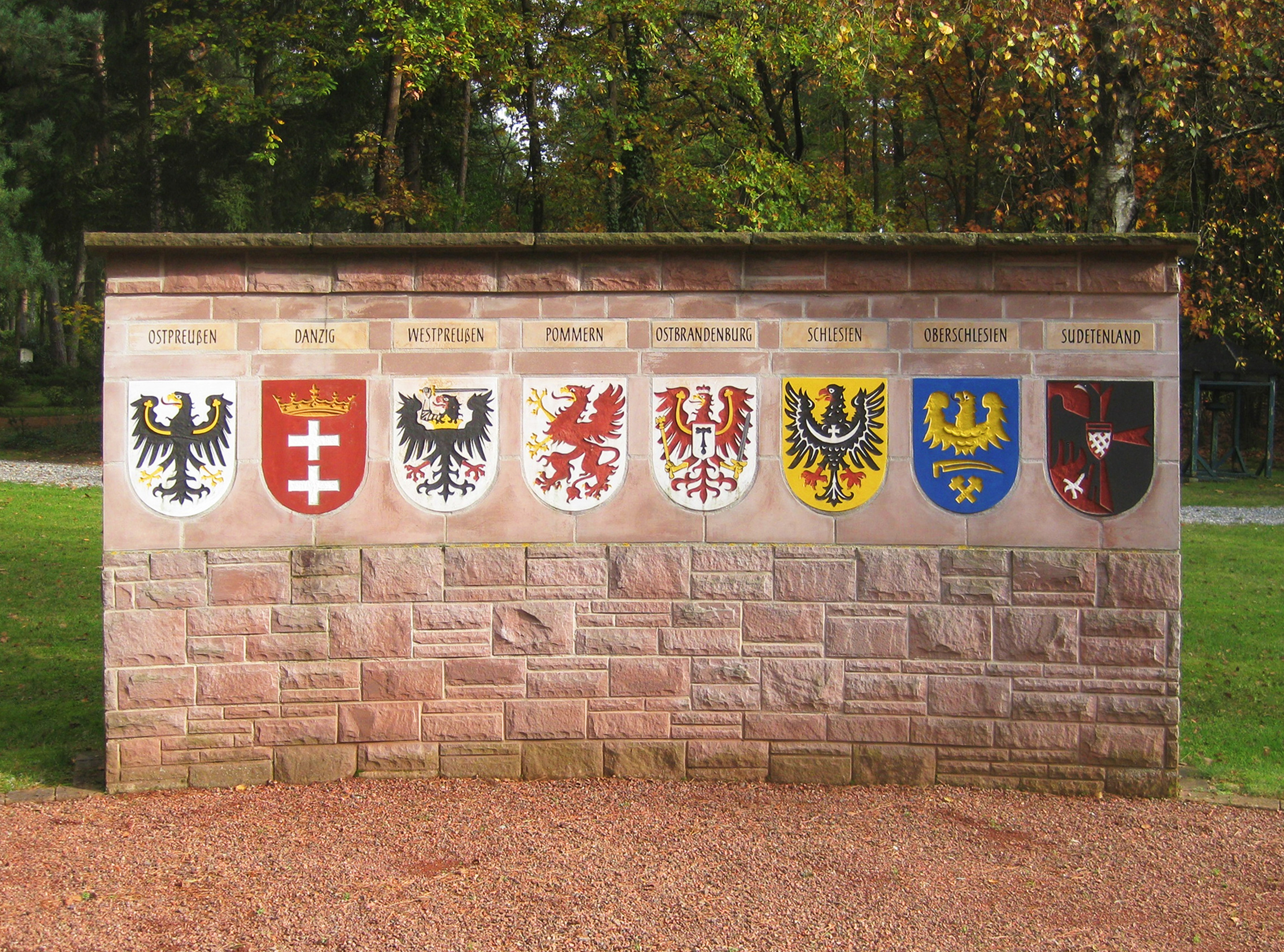
Expellee memorial, showing the coat of arms of East Prussia, Danzig, West Prussia, Pomerania, Brandenburg (for East Brandenburg), Silesia, Upper Silesia, and the (originally Austrian) Sudetenland. Historically, these coats of arms did not all exist at the same time. In addition, Posen is not included.

In 1990 Germany officially recognized its present eastern border at the time of its reunification in the Treaty on the Final Settlement with Respect to Germany and the German–Polish Border Treaty, ending any residual claims to sovereignty that Germany may have had over any territory east of the Oder–Neisse line. Over time, the "German question" has been muted by a number of related phenomena:

- The passage of time resulted in fewer people being left who have firsthand experience of living in these regions under German jurisdiction.
- In the Treaty on the Final Settlement With Respect to Germany, Germany renounced all claims to territory east of the Oder–Neisse line. Germany's recognition of the border was repeated in the German–Polish Border Treaty on 14 November 1990. The first of those treaties was made by both German states and ratified in 1991 by a united Germany. The second was already signed by the united Germany.
- The expansion of the European Union eastwards in 2004 enabled any German wishing to live and work in Poland, and thus east of the Oder–Neisse line, to do so without requiring a permit. German expellees and refugees became free to visit their former homes and set up residence, though some restrictions remained on the purchase of land and buildings. However, these areas are now overwhelmingly Polish and knowledge of the Polish language is generally required to integrate among the locals.
- Poland entered the Schengen Area on 21 December 2007, removing all border controls on its border with Germany.

Under Article 1 of the Treaty on Final Settlement, the new united Germany committed itself to renouncing any further territorial claims beyond the boundaries of East Germany, West Germany and Berlin; "The united Germany has no territorial claims whatsoever against other states and shall not assert any in the future." Furthermore, the Basic Law of the Federal Republic was required to be amended to state explicitly that full German unification had now been achieved, such that the new German state comprised the entirety of Germany, and that all constitutional mechanisms should be removed by which any territories outside those boundaries could otherwise subsequently be admitted; these new constitutional articles being bound by treaty not to be revoked. Article 23 of the Basic Law was repealed, closing off the possibility for any further states to apply for membership of the Federal Republic; while Article 146 was amended to state explicitly that the territory of the newly unified republic comprised the entirety of the German people; "This Basic Law, which since the achievement of the unity and freedom of Germany applies to the entire German people, shall cease to apply on the day on which a constitution freely adopted by the German people takes effect". This was confirmed in the 1990 rewording of the preamble; "Germans ... have achieved the unity and freedom of Germany in free self-determination. This Basic Law thus applies to the entire German people."

In the course of the German reunification, Chancellor Helmut Kohl initially caused international outcry by making no reference in his 10 Points to the acceptance of the border as definitive, but later reaffirmed reluctantly the acceptance of the territorial changes made after World War II, creating some outrage among the Federation of Expellees, while some Poles were concerned about a possible revival of their 1939 trauma through a "second German invasion", this time with the Germans buying back their land, which was cheaply available at the time. This happened on a smaller scale than many Poles expected, and the Baltic Sea coast of Poland has become a popular German tourist destination. The so-called "homesickness-tourism" which was often perceived as quite aggressive well into the 1990s now tends to be viewed as a good-natured nostalgia tour rather than an expression of anger and desire for the return of the lost territories.

=== Recent controversies ===
==== Claims by the Prussian Trust ====
Some organisations in Germany continue to claim the territories for Germany or property there for German citizens. The Prussian Trust (or the Prussian Claims Society), founded in 2000, that probably has less than a hundred members, re-opened the old dispute when in December 2006 it submitted 23 individual claims against the Polish government to the European Court of Human Rights asking for compensation or return of property appropriated from its members at the end of World War II. An expert report jointly commissioned by the German and Polish governments from specialists in international law have confirmed that the proposed complaints by the Prussian Trust had little hope of success. But the German government cannot prevent such requests being made and the Polish government has felt that the submissions warranted a comment by Anna Fotyga, the Polish Minister of the Foreign Affairs to "express [her] deepest concern upon receiving the information about a claim against Poland submitted by the Prussian Trust to the European Court of Human Rights". On 9 October 2008 the European Court of Human Rights declared the case of Preussische Treuhand v. Poland inadmissible, because the European Convention on Human Rights does not impose any obligations on the Contracting States to return property which was transferred to them before they ratified the convention.

==== Controversies caused by right-wing German political parties ====
After the National Democratic Party of Germany (NPD), described as a neo-Nazi organisation, won six seats in the parliament of Mecklenburg-Vorpommern in September 2006, the leader of the party, Udo Voigt, declared that his party demands Germany in "historical borders" and questioned the current border treaties. After World War II, the Gau of Pomerania was divided roughly with the western portion, now part of Mecklenburg-Vorpommern, Germany, and the eastern portion (including Szczecin) now part of Poland.

In 2023, the head of the far-right AfD in Germany, Alice Weidel, sparked outrage when saying that the AfD was the most popular party in "Central Germany", which referred to the states in the former GDR. This was interpreted by some Polish commentators that Weidel thought the former eastern territories were the real "Eastern Germany".

The AfD also set up a parliamentary working group on expellees and runs a facebook group for "Expellees, Returnees and German Minorities" (VAdM).

== See also ==
- List of people from the former eastern territories of Germany
- History of German settlement in Central and Eastern Europe
- Ostsiedlung
- East Elbia
- Germania Slavica
- Drang nach Osten
- Areas annexed by Germany
- World War II evacuation and expulsion
- Expulsion of Poles by Germany
- German evacuation from Central and Eastern Europe
- Evacuation of East Prussia
- Flight and expulsion of Germans (1944–1950)
- Flight and expulsion of Germans from Poland during and after World War II
- Polish population transfers (1944–1946)
