= Osovets (disambiguation) =

Osovets is the name of several localities in Russia.

- Osovets, Vladimir Oblast
- Osovets, Ryazan Oblast
- Osovets, Tver Oblast

== See also ==
- Osovets Offensive
- Asavyets (disambiguation), places in Belarus named "Osovets" in Russian
- Osowiec (disambiguation), Places in Poland, many of which were named "Osovets" in Russian when a significant part of Poland was part of the Russian Empire
