= Osowiec =

Osowiec may refer to:

- Osowiec, Łódź Voivodeship (central Poland)
- Osowiec, Lubusz Voivodeship (west Poland)
- Osowiec, Masovian Voivodeship (east-central Poland)
- Osowiec, Łomża County in Podlaskie Voivodeship (north-east Poland)
- Osowiec, Mońki County in Podlaskie Voivodeship (north-east Poland)
- Osowiec, Zambrów County in Podlaskie Voivodeship (north-east Poland)
- Osowiec, Pomeranian Voivodeship (north Poland)
- Osowiec, Warmian-Masurian Voivodeship (north Poland)
- Osowiec, Słupca County in Greater Poland Voivodeship (west-central Poland)
- Osowiec, Złotów County in Greater Poland Voivodeship (west-central Poland)
- Osówiec, Greater Poland Voivodeship, Greater Poland Voivodeship (west-central Poland)
- Osowiec Fortress, Russian fortress built in the 19th century in modern-day Osowiec-Twierdza, defended during World War I, today in Poland

== See also ==
- Asavyets (disambiguation)
- Osovets (disambiguation)
- Osowiec-Leśniczówka, a village in Łomża County, Podlaskie Voivodeship
- Osowiec-Twierdza, a village in Gmina Goniądz, Mońki County, Podlaskie Voivodeship
