= Targowisko Dolne =

- Village
- Location within Poland
- Coordinates: 53°29′36″N 19°42′34″E
- Country: Poland
- Voivodeship: Warmian-Masurian
- County: Iława
- Gmina: Lubawa
- Population: 260

Targowisko Dolne [tarɡɔˈviskɔ ˈdɔlnɛ] is a village in the administrative district of Gmina Lubawa, within Iława County, Warmian-Masurian Voivodeship, in northern Poland.
