= Pomierki =

- Village
- Location within Poland
- Coordinates: 53°36′N 19°48′E
- Country: Poland
- Voivodeship: Warmian-Masurian
- County: Iława
- Gmina: Lubawa

Pomierki [pɔˈmjɛrki] is a village in the administrative district of Gmina Lubawa, within Iława County, Warmian-Masurian Voivodeship, in northern Poland.
