= Lubstyn =

- Village
- Location within Poland
- Coordinates: 53°31′41″N 19°50′35″E
- Country: Poland
- Voivodeship: Warmian-Masurian
- County: Iława
- Gmina: Lubawa

Lubstyn [ˈlupstɨn] is a village in the administrative district of Gmina Lubawa, within Iława County, Warmian-Masurian Voivodeship, in northern Poland.
