= Raczek =

- Village
- Location within Poland
- Coordinates: 53°32′25″N 19°41′36″E
- Country: Poland
- Voivodeship: Warmian-Masurian
- County: Iława
- Gmina: Lubawa
- Population: 20

Raczek [ˈrat͡ʂɛk] is a village in the administrative district of Gmina Lubawa, within Iława County, Warmian-Masurian Voivodeship, in northern Poland.
