= Biała Góra, Warmian-Masurian Voivodeship =

Biała Góra
- Village
- Location within Poland
- Coordinates: 53°30′38″N 19°38′36″E
- Country: Poland
- Voivodeship: Warmian-Masurian
- County: Iława
- Gmina: Lubawa
- Population: 110

Biała Góra [ˈbjawa ˈɡura] is a village in the administrative district of Gmina Lubawa, within Iława County, Warmian-Masurian Voivodeship, in northern Poland.
