= Gutowo, Warmian-Masurian Voivodeship =

Gutowo
- Village
- Location within Poland
- Coordinates: 53°26′N 19°55′E
- Country: Poland
- Voivodeship: Warmian-Masurian
- County: Iława
- Gmina: Lubawa
- Population: 250

Gutowo [ɡuˈtɔvɔ] is a village in the administrative district of Gmina Lubawa, in Iława County, Warmian-Masurian Voivodeship, in northern Poland.
