= Złotowo, Warmian-Masurian Voivodeship =

Złotowo
- Village
- Location within Poland
- Coordinates: 53°31′4″N 19°48′38″E
- Country: Poland
- Voivodeship: Warmian-Masurian
- County: Iława
- Gmina: Lubawa
- Population: 530

Złotowo [zwɔˈtɔvɔ] is a village in the administrative district of Gmina Lubawa, within Iława County, Warmian-Masurian Voivodeship, in northern Poland.
