= Gmina Lubawa =

Gmina Lubawa Lubawa Commune
- Gmina
- Flag Coat of arms
- Interactive map of Gmina Lubawa
- Coordinates (Fijewo): 53°29′41″N 19°46′8″E
- Country: Poland
- Voivodeship: Warmian-Masurian
- County: Iława
- Seat: Lubawa

Area
  - Total: 236.64 km^{2} (91.37 sq mi)

Population (2006)
  - Total: 10,435
  - Density: 44.097/km^{2} (114.21/sq mi)
- Website: http://www.gminalubawa.pl/

Gmina Lubawa is a rural gmina (administrative district) in Iława County, Warmian-Masurian Voivodeship, in northern Poland. It takes its name from the town of Lubawa, although the town is not part of the territory of the gmina. The administrative seat of the gmina is the village of Fijewo, which lies close to Lubawa.

The gmina covers an area of 236.64 square kilometres (91.4 sq mi), and as of 2006 its population was 10,435.

The gmina contains part of the protected area called Dylewo Hills Landscape Park.

== Villages ==
Gmina Lubawa contains the villages and settlements of Biała Góra, Byszwałd, Czerlin, Fijewo, Gajówka, Gierłoż, Gierłoż Polska, Grabowo, Grabowo-Osada, Gutowo, Kazanice, Kołodziejki, Łążek, Łążyn, Losy, Lubstyn, Lubstynek, Ludwichowo, Mortęgi, Napromek, Napromek-Leśniczówka, Omule, Osowiec, Pomierki, Prątnica, Raczek, Rakowice, Rodzone, Rożental, Rumienica, Sampława, Szczepankowo, Targowisko Dolne, Targowisko Górne, Tuszewo, Wałdyki, Wiśniewo, Zielkowo and Złotowo.

== Neighbouring gminas ==
Gmina Lubawa is bordered by the town of Lubawa and by the gminas of Dąbrówno, Grodziczno, Iława, Nowe Miasto Lubawskie, Ostróda, and Rybno.
