= Wiśniewo, Iława County =

Village in Poland

Wiśniewo
- Village
- Location within Poland
- Coordinates: 53°33′N 19°51′E
- Country: Poland
- Voivodeship: Warmian-Masurian
- County: Iława
- Gmina: Lubawa
- Population: 180

Wiśniewo [viɕˈɲɛvɔ] is a village in the administrative district of Gmina Lubawa, within Iława County, Warmian-Masurian Voivodeship, in northern Poland.
