= Asavyets =

Asavyets (Belarusian: Асавец; Russian: Осовец, romanized: Osovets) may refer to the following places in Belarus:

- Asavyets, Asavyets Selsoviet, Lyuban District, an agrotown in Lyuban District, Minsk Region
- Asavyets, Beshankovichy District, a village in Beshankovichy District, Vitebsk Region
- Asavyets, Byalynichy District, a village in Byalynichy District, Mogilev Region
- Asavyets, Chashniki District, a village in Chashniki District, Vitebsk Region
- Asavyets, Kapyl District, a village in Kapyl District, Minsk Region
- Asavyets, Krupki District, a village in Krupki District, Minsk Region
- Asavyets, Krychaw District, a village in Krychaw District, Mogilev Region
- Asavyets, Maladzyechna District, a village in Maladzyechna District, Minsk Region
- Asavyets, Mazyr District, a village in Mazyr District, Gomel Region
- Asavyets, Staryya Darohi District, a village in Staryya Darohi District, Minsk Region
- Asavyets, Vileyka District, a village in Vileyka District, Minsk Region

== See also ==
- Osowiec (disambiguation)
- Osovets (disambiguation)
