= Byszwałd =

- Village
- Location within Poland
- Coordinates: 53°31′58″N 19°44′26″E
- Country: Poland
- Voivodeship: Warmian-Masurian
- County: Iława
- Gmina: Lubawa
- Population: 550

Byszwałd [ˈbɨʂfau̯t] is a village in the administrative district of Gmina Lubawa, within Iława County, Warmian-Masurian Voivodeship, in northern Poland.
