= Rodzone, Warmian-Masurian Voivodeship =

Rodzone
- Village
- Location within Poland
- Coordinates: 53°31′N 19°40′E
- Country: Poland
- Voivodeship: Warmian-Masurian
- County: Iława
- Gmina: Lubawa
- Population: 140

Rodzone [rɔˈd͡zɔnɛ] is a village in the administrative district of Gmina Lubawa, within Iława County, Warmian-Masurian Voivodeship, in northern Poland.
