= Mortęgi =

- Village
- Location within Poland
- Coordinates: 53°28′N 19°44′E
- Country: Poland
- Voivodeship: Warmian-Masurian
- County: Iława
- Gmina: Lubawa
- Population (approx.): 600

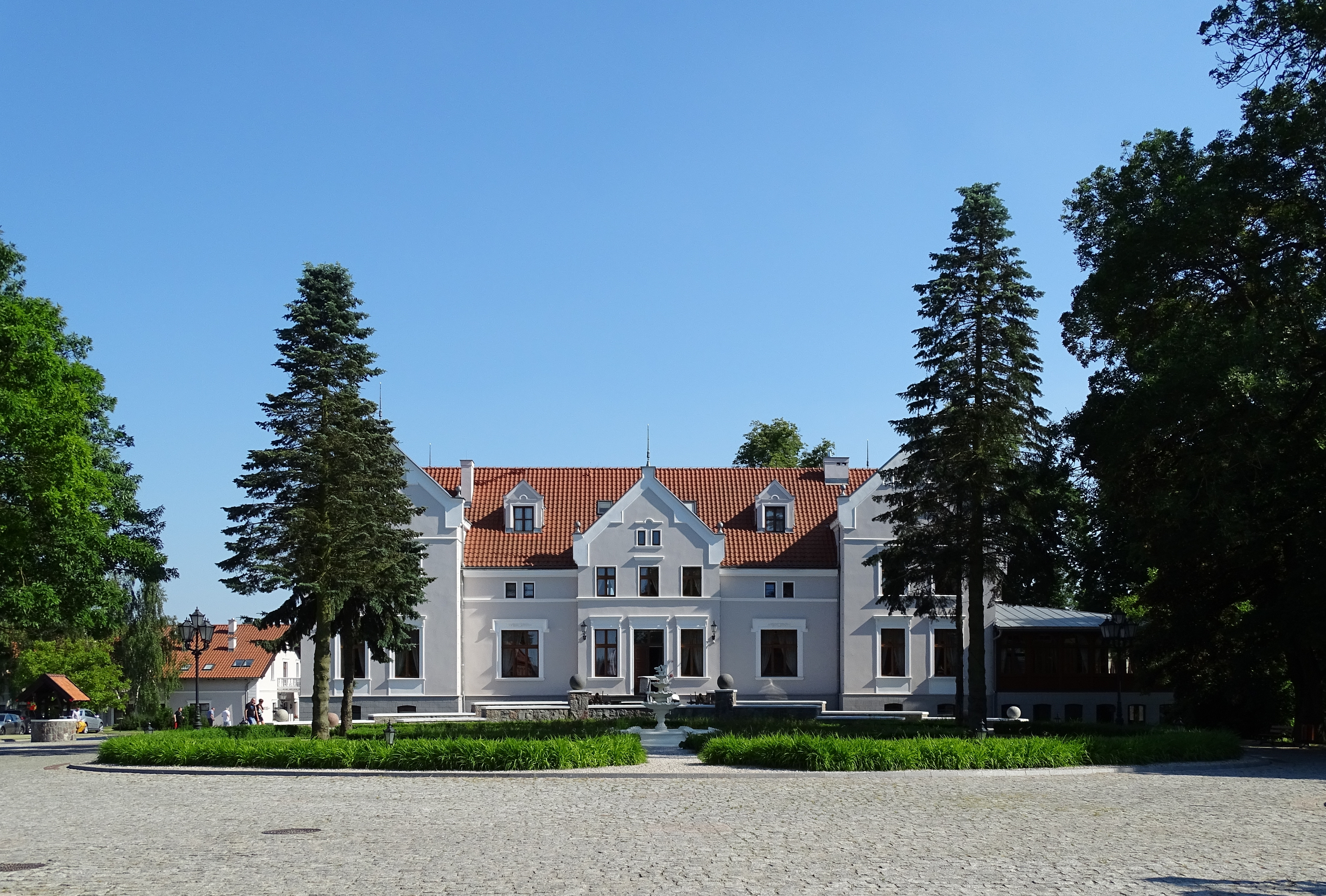
The manor house.

Mortęgi [mɔrˈtɛnɡi] is a village in the administrative district of Gmina Lubawa, within Iława County, Warmian-Masurian Voivodeship, in northern Poland.
