= Fijewo, Warmian-Masurian Voivodeship =

Fijewo
- Village
- Location within Poland
- Coordinates: 53°29′41″N 19°46′8″E
- Country: Poland
- Voivodeship: Warmian-Masurian
- County: Iława
- Gmina: Lubawa

Fijewo [fiˈjɛvɔ] is a village, the seat of the administrative district of Gmina Lubawa, within Iława County, Warmian-Masurian Voivodeship, in northern Poland.
