= Gajówka, Warmian-Masurian Voivodeship =

Gajówka
- Village
- Location within Poland
- Coordinates: 53°27′24″N 19°43′30″E
- Country: Poland
- Voivodeship: Warmian-Masurian
- County: Iława
- Gmina: Lubawa

Gajówka [ɡaˈjufka] is a village in the administrative district of Gmina Lubawa, within Iława County, Warmian-Masurian Voivodeship, in northern Poland.
