= Napromek-Leśniczówka =

- Village
- Location within Poland
- Coordinates: 53°30′N 19°53′E
- Country: Poland
- Voivodeship: Warmian-Masurian
- County: Iława
- Gmina: Lubawa

Napromek-Leśniczówka (Polish pronunciation: [naˈprɔmɛk lɛɕɲiˈtʂufka]) is a village in the administrative district of Gmina Lubawa, within Iława County, Warmian-Masurian Voivodeship, in northern Poland.
