= Kazanice =

- Village
- Location within Poland
- Coordinates: 53°33′16″N 19°43′38″E
- Country: Poland
- Voivodeship: Warmian-Masurian
- County: Iława
- Gmina: Lubawa
- Population: 720

Kazanice [kazaˈnit͡sɛ] is a village in the administrative district of Gmina Lubawa, within Iława County, Warmian-Masurian Voivodeship, in northern Poland.
