= Szczepankowo, Iława County =

Szczepankowo
- Village
- Location within Poland
- Coordinates: 53°28′32″N 19°52′14″E
- Country: Poland
- Voivodeship: Warmian-Masurian
- County: Iława
- Gmina: Lubawa

Szczepankowo [ʂt͡ʂɛpanˈkɔvɔ] is a village in the administrative district of Gmina Lubawa, within Iława County, Warmian-Masurian Voivodeship, in northern Poland.
