= Ludwichowo, Warmian-Masurian Voivodeship =

Ludwichowo
- Village
- Location within Poland
- Coordinates: 53°29′N 19°41′E
- Country: Poland
- Voivodeship: Warmian-Masurian
- County: Iława
- Gmina: Lubawa

Ludwichowo [ludviˈxɔvɔ] is a village in the administrative district of Gmina Lubawa, within Iława County, Warmian-Masurian Voivodeship, in northern Poland.
