= Grabowo-Osada =

- Settlement
- Location within Poland
- Coordinates: 53°32′59″N 19°48′09″E
- Country: Poland
- Voivodeship: Warmian-Masurian
- County: Iława
- Gmina: Lubawa

Grabowo-Osada [ɡraˈbɔvɔ ɔˈsada] is a settlement in the administrative district of Gmina Lubawa, within Iława County, Warmian-Masurian Voivodeship, in northern Poland.
