= Osovets =

Osovets Осовец
- Selo
- Location within Vladimir Oblast Location within Russia
- Coordinates: 55°53′N 39°52′E
- Country: Russia
- Region: Vladimir Oblast
- District: Sobinsky District
- Time zone: UTC+3:00

Osovets (Russian: Осовец) is a rural locality (a selo) in Kopninskoye Rural Settlement, Sobinsky District, Vladimir Oblast, Russia. The population was 216 as of 2010.

== Geography ==
Osovets is located 29 km southwest of Sobinka (the district's administrative centre) by road. Tsepelevo is the nearest rural locality.
