= 6 October 1939 Reichstag speech =

Speech given by Adolf Hitler

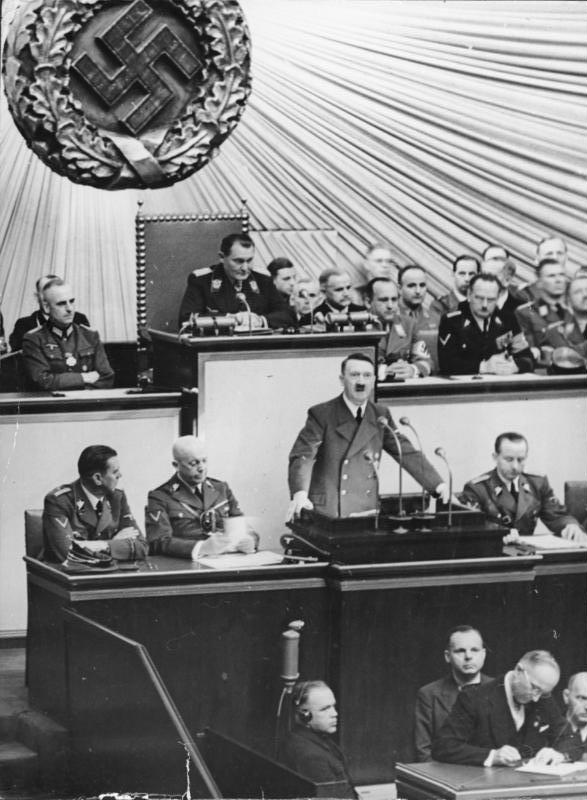

Hitler's 6 October 1939 Reichstag speech was a speech given by Adolf Hitler shortly after the Invasion of Poland. It featured Hitler's penultimate offer of peace to the Western Allies.

== The speech ==
Having just returned from a tour of the ruined city of Warsaw, Hitler spent much the 80 or 90 minutes of the speech in a celebratory and highly mendacious accounting of the conquest of Poland. Hitler averred that "A state of no less than 36,000,000 inhabitants... took up arms against us. Their arms were far-reaching, and their confidence in their ability to crush Germany knew no bounds...". He claimed that he had restricted bombings to military targets and that he had offered to let civilians in Warsaw evacuate the city but had been refused.

Hitler vouchsafed that going back to the Middle Ages "The outstanding features of Polish character were cruelty and lack of moral restraint", that the "shameless insults" that Poles had offered to Germany were unbearable, that the Polish government had been supported by only 15% of the population and had been "a lapdog of the Western Democracies". Hitler then made vague threats of Germany (with the Soviets) projecting its power into southeastern Europe.

Shifting tone, Hitler then offered the olive branch of peace to France and Britain. He condemned war as an enterprise where all participants were losers after enduring millions of deaths and billions of lost wealth. That if war with France should continue, "One day there will again be a frontier between Germany and France, but instead of flourishing towns there will be ruins and endless graveyards", and seemed to suggest that another European peace conference be held:

My chief endeavor has been to rid our relations with France of all trace of ill will... I have always expressed to France my desire to bury forever our ancient enmity... I have devoted no less effort to the achievement of Anglo-German friendship... To achieve this great end [of peace], the leading nations of this continent will one day have to come together in order to draw up, accept and guarantee a statute on a comprehensive basis which will insure for them all a sense of security, of calm – in short, of peace... It is equally impossible that such a conference, which is to determine the fate of this continent for many years to come, could carry on its deliberations while cannons are thundering or mobilized armies are bringing pressure to bear upon it...

Among the goals of Germany in such a conference, Hitler declared, would be "An attempt to reach a solution and settlement of the Jewish problem."

Hitler then finished with more braggadocio: "If, however, the opinions of Messrs. Churchill and his followers should prevail, this statement will have been my last."

== Response ==
Western response to the peace proposal was markedly unenthusiastic. The New York Stock Exchange dropped a few points the next day, inconsistent with any belief that peace might be actually forthcoming. Veteran Berlin correspondent William Shirer thought it transparently insincere, "like an old gramophone record being played for the fifth or sixth time".

The Western governments were similarly unimpressed: the next day, French prime minister Édouard Daladier declared that France would not consider peace unless guarantees for "real peace and general security" were obtained, and on 10 October gave a fairly belligerent and martial radio address, speaking of French advances into German territory, and dismissing German sincerity: "After Austria came Czechoslovakia, and after Czechoslovakia, Poland. All these undertakings were only steps on the path which would have brought France and Europe to the harshest of slaveries. I know that they talk to you today of peace, of German peace, of peace which would only consecrate conquests by deceit or violence and would not prevent preparation for new ones" and declaiming "France, upon whom war has been imposed, speaks in battle the same language she has always spoken. I affirm, then, that we are fighting and we will continue to fight to obtain a definite guaranty of security."

British prime minister Neville Chamberlain addressed the House of Commons on October 12 and declared Hitler's proposals to be vague and uncertain, and did not address the righting the wrongs done to Czechoslovakia and Poland. He said that no further reliance could be placed on Hitler's promises and that "acts – not words alone – must be forthcoming" if peace was to come.

In turn, an official German statement on 13 October declared that Chamberlain, by rejecting Hitler's peace offer, had deliberately chosen war. This was Hitler's penultimate peace offer, the last coming in 1940 after the Fall of France.

== Further reading and listening ==
- Text of the speech (English translation)
- Excerpts of the speech (in German)
- Paish, George; Carnegie Endowment International Peace (2013). Text of Chancellor Hitler's Speech Before the Reichstag, October 6, 1939. Literary Licensing, LLC. ISBN 978-1258736439. Also includes full text of Premier Daladier's Broadcast To The French Nation of October 10, 1939 and Chamberlain's Speech Before The House Of Commons on October 12, 1939, and analysis.
- Hill, Christoper (1991). Cabinet Decisions on Foreign Policy: The British Experience October 1938 – June 1941. Cambridge University Press. ISBN 0521391954.
- Hitler, Adolph (speaker) (6 October 1939). Adolf Hitler Addresses The Reichstag – October 6, 1939 – Past Daily Reference Room (Audio recording) (mp3) (in German). Berlin: Past Daily. 77984359.
