= Czerlin, Warmian-Masurian Voivodeship =

Czerlin
- Village
- Location within Poland
- Coordinates: 53°30′N 19°53′E
- Country: Poland
- Voivodeship: Warmian-Masurian
- County: Iława
- Gmina: Lubawa

Czerlin [ˈt͡ʂɛrlin] is a village in the administrative district of Gmina Lubawa, within Iława County, Warmian-Masurian Voivodeship, in northern Poland.

The village was ceded to Poland after the East Prussian plebiscite in 1920.
