= Timeline of Saint Petersburg =

Coordinates: 59.95°N 30.3°E

The following is a timeline of the history of the city of Saint Petersburg, Russia.

== 17th–18th centuries ==
- 1611 – Nyenschantz built by Swedes.
- 1703
  - City founded by Tsar Peter the Great
  - Cabin of Peter the Great built.
  - Artillery museum formed.
- 1709 – Petrischule founded.
- 1710 – Saint Sampson's Church built.
- 1711 – Menshikov Palace opens.
- 1712
  - City becomes capital of Russian Empire.
  - Winter Palace built.
- 1714
  - Library of the Russian Academy of Sciences founded.
  - Summer Palace of Peter the Great built.
- 1716 – Catholic Church of St. Catherine founded.
- 1718 – Saint Petersburg Police established.
- 1719 – Summer Garden laid out.
- 1720
  - Hermitage Bridge opens.
  - New Holland Island created.
- 1721 – Ligovsky Canal constructed.
- 1724
  - Saint Petersburg Academy of Sciences founded.
  - Saint Petersburg Mint founded.
- 1725
  - Peterhof Palace built (approximate date).
  - Death of Peter the Great.
- 1727 – Kunstkamera built.
- 1728 – State capital moves to Moscow from St. Petersburg.
- 1731 – Cadet Corps founded.
- 1732 – State capital moves back to St. Petersburg from Moscow, after only 4 years, and will remain there for nearly two centuries.
- 1733 – Peter and Paul Cathedral built.
- 1736 – Fire.
- 1738 – Imperial Ballet School established.
- 1740
  - Peter and Paul Fortress built.
  - Mariinsky Ballet founded (approximate date).
- 1744
  - Lomonosov Porcelain Factory founded.
  - Twelve Collegia built.
- 1748 – Smolensky Lutheran Cemetery opens.
- 1754
  - Stroganov Palace built.
  - Anichkov Palace built.
  - Transfiguration Cathedral built.
- 1756 – Alexandrinsky Theatre founded.
- 1757
  - Academy of the Three Noblest Arts founded.
  - Vorontsov Palace built.
- 1759 – Page Corps founded.
- 1762 – Winter Palace built.
- 1764
  - Hermitage Museum established.
  - Institute for Noble Maidens founded.
- 1770
  - Foundling Hospital established.
  - Moika Palace built.
- 1771 – Chicherin House built.
- 1773
  - Mining School established.
  - Volkovo Cemetery established.
- 1774 – Roller coaster pavilion built at Oranienbaum.
- 1777
  - The Karl Knipper Theatre is founded.
  - The Neva caused flooding.
- 1779 – Free Russian Theatre opens.
- 1780
  - Saint Andrew's Cathedral consecrated.
  - Chesme Church built.
- 1782 – Bronze Horseman monument unveiled.
- 1783
  - Russian Imperial Opera Orchestra formed.
  - Kamenny Theatre opens.
- 1785
  - City Duma established.
  - Hermitage Theatre opens.
  - Great Gostiny Dvor built.
  - Marble Palace built.

== 19th century ==
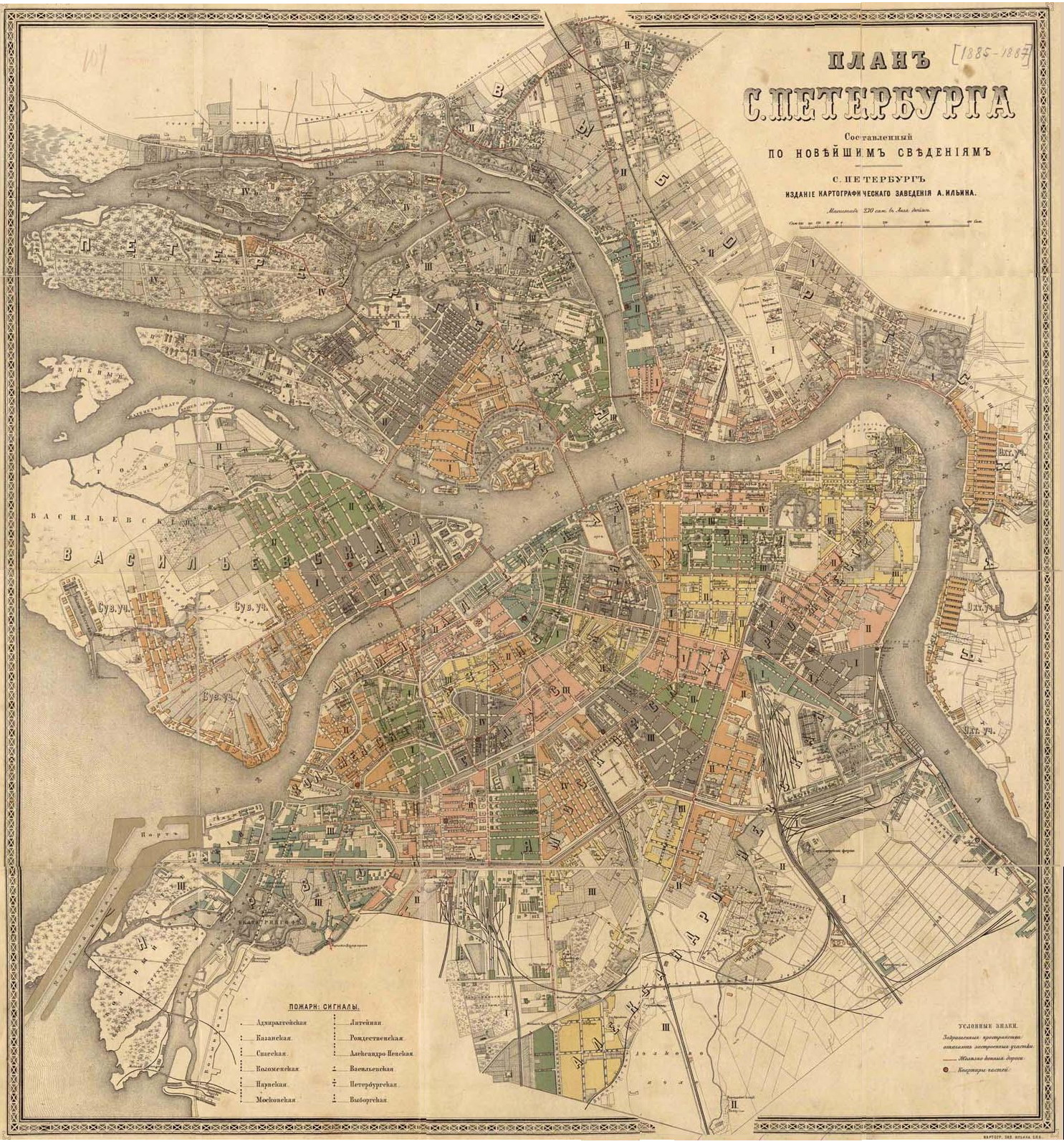
Map of St. Petersburg, 1880s

- 1801
  - Friendly Society of Aficionados of Elegance formed.
  - Saint Michael's Castle built.
  - Tsarina's Meadow renamed Field of Mars.
- 1802 – Saint Petersburg Philharmonia formed.
- 1804 – Petersburg Pedagogical Institute established.
- 1805 – Russian Naval Museum established.
- 1806 – Police Bridge rebuilt.
- 1807 – Constantine Palace built.
- 1808 – Smolny Institute building constructed.
- 1810
  - Military Engineering school established.
  - Stock Exchange built.
- 1811 – Kazan Cathedral built.
- 1812 – Syn otechestva begins publication.
- 1813 – Red Bridge built.
- 1814
  - Imperial Public Library opens.
  - Narva Triumphal Arch erected.
- 1818
  - Otechestvennye Zapiski begins publication.
  - Blue Bridge built.
  - Asiatic Museum founded.
- 1819 – Saint Petersburg University formed.
- 1822 – Yelagin Palace built.
- 1823 – Admiralty building rebuilt.
- 1824 - The Neva caused flooding.
- 1825
  - December – Interregnum.
  - Decembrist revolt.
  - Northern Bee begins publication.
  - Mikhailovsky Palace built.
- 1826 – Kamenny Island Theatre building constructed.
- 1829 – General Staff Building constructed.
- 1832 – Zoological Museum established.
- 1833
  - Obvodny Canal opens.
  - Mikhaylovsky Theatre founded.
- 1834 – Alexander Column unveiled.
- 1835
  - Imperial School of Jurisprudence founded.
  - Trinity Cathedral built.
- 1836
  - Sovremennik begins publication.
  - Premiere of Glinka's opera A Life for the Tsar.
- 1838 – Moscow Triumphal Gate erected.
- 1839
  - Observatory opens.
  - Bolshoi Zal built.
- 1842 – Alexander Park established.
- 1844 – Mariinsky Palace built.
- 1848 – Beloselsky-Belozersky Palace expanded.
- 1850 – Blagoveshchensky Bridge built.
- 1851
  - Moscow – Saint Petersburg Railway begins operating.
  - Nicholaevsky rail terminal opens.
- 1858 – Saint Isaac's Cathedral built.
- 1860 – Mariinsky Theatre opens.
- 1861 – Nicholas Palace built.
- 1862
  - Saint Petersburg Conservatory founded.
  - New Michael Palace built.
  - November: Premiere of Verdi's opera La forza del destino.
- 1863 – Pavel Military School established.
- 1866
  - Vestnik Evropy begins publication.
  - Dostoyevsky's fictional Crime and Punishment published.
- 1867 – Khlebnikov founded.
- 1869 - Population: 667,926.
- 1870 – Riihimäki – Saint Petersburg Railway constructed.
- 1874 – Premiere of Musorgsky's opera Boris Godunov.
- 1876 – School of Technical Drawing founded.
- 1877 – Ciniselli Circus opens.
- 1878 – Bestuzhev Courses and Stieglitz Museum established.
- 1879
  - Peter the Great Museum of Anthropology and Ethnography established.
  - Nobel Brothers Petroleum Company headquartered in city.
- 1881 - Population: 861,303.
- 1882 – Imperial Music Choir formed.
- 1888 - Ship canal completed.
- 1890
  - Saint Petersburg Prison for Solitary Confinement built.
  - Population: 954,400.
- 1893 - Premiere of Tchaikovsky's Symphony No. 6.
- 1894 – Ves Peterburg directory begins publication.
- 1895 – Conversion of Mikhailovsky Palace into Russian Museum.
- 1897 - Population: 1,267,023.
- 1900
  - Russian cruiser Aurora launched.
  - Suvorov Museum founded.

== 20th century ==
=== 1900s–1940s ===
- 1905
  - January – Bloody Sunday.
  - October – Saint Petersburg Soviet formed.
  - Population: 1,429,000.
- 1907 – Electric trams begin operating.
- 1909 – Na Liteinom Theatre founded.
- 1910 – March: Soyuz Molodyozhi art exhibit held.
- 1913 – Population: 2,318,645.
- 1914 – City renamed "Petrograd."
- 1916
  - Grigori Rasputin assassinated.
  - Palace Bridge built.
- 1917
  - February Revolution begins.
  - March – Petrograd Soviet formed.
  - July Days.
  - August – Golos Truda begins publication.
  - October Revolution.
- 1918
  - State capital moves to Moscow from Petrograd.
  - Osobaya Drammaticheskaya Truppa organized.
  - Ioffe Institute established.
- 1920 – Theatrical re-enactment of Storming of the Winter Palace.
- 1921 – Art Culture Museum opens.
- 1922 – Leningrad Young People's Theatre opens.
- 1923 – Russian Museum of Ethnography opens.
- 1924 – City renamed Leningrad.
- 1928 – Circus museum opens.
- 1929 – Young Theatre founded.
- 1931 – Komarov Botanical Institute and Leningrad Radio Orchestra established.
- 1932
  - Shosseynaya Airport begins operating.
  - Leningrad Union of Soviet Artists and St Petersburg Union of Composers founded.
  - Bolshoy Dom built.
  - Avrora Cinema active.
- 1934
  - Sergey Kirov assassinated.
  - Leningrad Secondary Art School established.
  - Premiere of Shostakovich's opera Lady Macbeth of the Mtsensk District.
- 1936
  - Arctic and Antarctic Museum opens.
  - Memorial Lenin Komsomol Theatre established.
- 1938 – Museum of History and Development of Leningrad established.
- 1941
  - Siege of Leningrad begins.
  - Road of Life begins operating.
- 1942 – Russian Museum of Military Medicine founded.
- 1944
  - Siege of Leningrad ends.
  - State Puppet Theatre of Fairy Tales established.
- 1946 – Moskovsky Victory Park opens.
- 1949 – Leningrad Affair.

=== 1950s–1990s ===
- 1953
  - Pavlovsky District becomes part of city.
  - Pushkin Museum established.
- 1954 – Levashovo, Pargolovo, and Pesochny become part of city.
- 1955 – Saint Petersburg Metro begins operating.
- 1962 – Saint Petersburg TV Tower constructed.
- 1963 – Aeroflot Tupolev Tu-124 Neva river ditching.
- 1965 – Population: 3,329,000 city; 3,641,000 urban agglomeration.
- 1967 – Museum of Electrical Transport established.
- 1971
  - Dostoevsky Museum opens.
  - Rimsky-Korsakov Museum established.
- 1974 – Na Fontanke Youth Theatre founded.
- 1981 – Leningrad Rock Club opens.
- 1984
  - Teatralnaya laboratoriya founded.
  - Sister city relationship established with Los Angeles, United States.
- 1985 – Population: 4,867,000.
- 1987
  - Na Neve Theatre opens.
  - Zazerkalie (theatre) opens.
- 1988 – Xenia of Saint Petersburg canonized.
- 1989
  - Komedianty Theatre founded.
  - Akhmatova Museum opens.
- 1990 – Ostrov Theatre opens.
- 1991
  - City renamed Saint Petersburg.
  - Flag design adopted.
  - Anatoly Aleksandrovich Sobchak becomes mayor.
- 1993 – Tunnel nightclub opens.
- 1994
  - Legislative Assembly of Saint Petersburg formed.
  - St Petersburg Ballet Theatre founded.
- 1996 – Vladimir Anatolyevich Yakovlev becomes city governor.
- 1997 – Toy Museum established.
- 1998
  - Politician Galina Starovoytova assassinated.
  - Nabokov Museum opens.
- 2000 – City designated administrative center of Northwestern Federal District.

== 21st century ==
- 2000
  - The 2000 IIHF Men's World Championships are held in Saint Petersburg.
- 2003
  - Aleksandr Dmitriyevich Beglov becomes city governor, succeeded by Valentina Ivanovna Matvienko.
  - Peter & Paul Jazz Festival begins.
  - Museum of Optical Technologies opens.
  - Saint Petersburg Children´s Hospice opens.
- 2004
  - Big Obukhovsky Bridge opens.
  - Sergey Kuryokhin Center for Modern Art established.
- 2005 – Gas incident.
- 2006 – 32nd G8 summit held.
- 2007 – Dissenters' March.
- 2008 – Side by Side (film festival) begins.
- 2009 – Gallery of Contemporary Sculpture and Plastic Arts opens.
- 2010
  - Yota Space art festival begins.
  - Erarta art museum established.
- 2011
  - Georgy Sergeyevich Poltavchenko becomes city governor.
  - Saint Petersburg Dam inaugurated.
  - Saint Petersburg Ring Road opens.
  - St. Petersburg International Legal Forum begins.
- 2013 – September: 2013 G-20 Saint Petersburg summit.
- 2017
  - A bombing attack hits Saint Petersburg's metro.

== See also ==
- History of Saint Petersburg
- Governor of Saint Petersburg
- Floods in Saint Petersburg
- List of theatres in Saint Petersburg
- Timelines of other cities in the Northwestern Federal District of Russia: Kaliningrad, Pskov

Disambiguation pages

- Convention of St Petersburg (disambiguation)
- Saint Petersburg Declaration (disambiguation)
- Treaty of Saint Petersburg (disambiguation)

== Bibliography ==
=== Published in 18th–19th centuries ===
- Joseph Marshall (1773), "Petersburg", Travels through Holland, Flanders, Germany, Denmark, Sweden, Lapland, Russia, the Ukraine & Poland in the years 1768, 1769, & 1770 (2nd ed.), London: Printed for J. Almon
- William Coxe (1784), "Petersburgh", Travels into Poland, Russia, Sweden and Denmark, London: Printed by J. Nichols, for T. Cadell, OCLC 654136
- Conrad Malte-Brun (1827), "Petersburg", Universal Geography, vol. 6, Edinburgh: Adam Black
- Josiah Conder (1830), "St. Petersburgh", Russia, The Modern Traveller, vol. 17, London: J.Duncan
- David Brewster, ed. (1832). "St. Petersburg". Edinburgh Encyclopædia. Vol. 15. Philadelphia: Joseph and Edward Parker. hdl:2027/uc2.ark:/13960/t0gt5vw9n.
- Francis Coghlan (1834). Guide to St. Petersburgh and Moscow. London.
- John Thomson (1845), "St. Petersburg", New Universal Gazetteer and Geographical Dictionary, London: H.G. Bohn
- "St. Petersburg". Hand-book for Travellers in Russia, Poland, and Finland (2nd ed.). London: John Murray. 1868.
- John Ramsay McCulloch (1880), "Petersburg", in Hugh G. Reid (ed.), A Dictionary, Practical, Theoretical and Historical of Commerce and Commercial Navigation, London: Longmans, Green, and Co.
- Maturin Murray Ballou (1887), "(St. Petersburg)", Due North; or, Glimpses of Scandinavia and Russia, Boston: Ticknor and Company

=== Published in 20th century ===
- Annette M.B. Meakin (1906). "St. Petersburg". Russia, Travels and Studies. London: Hurst and Blackett. OCLC 3664651.
- Kropotkin, Peter Alexeivitch; Bealby, John Thomas (1910). "St Petersburg" . Encyclopædia Britannica. Vol. 24 (11th ed.). pp. 38–40.
- Benjamin Vincent (1910), "St. Petersburg", Haydn's Dictionary of Dates (25th ed.), London: Ward, Lock & Co.
- Ruth Kedzie Wood (1912), "The Capital", The Tourist's Russia, New York: Dodd, Mead and Company, OCLC 526774
- Nevin O. Winter (1913). "The Capital". Russian Empire of To-day and Yesterday. Boston: L. C. Page.
- "St. Petersburg", Russia, Leipzig: Karl Baedeker, 1914, OCLC 1328163
- Francis Whiting Halsey, ed. (1914). "St. Petersburg". Russia, Scandinavia, and the Southeast. Seeing Europe with Famous Authors. Vol. 10. Funk & Wagnalls Company – via HathiTrust.
- Harold Whitmore Williams (1915), "In the Chief City", Russia of the Russians, New York: C. Scribner's Sons
- James William Barnes Steveni (1916), Petrograd, Past and Present, Philadelphia: Lippincott, OCLC 2399981, OL 14034111M
- Ian M. Matley (1981). "Defense Manufactures of St. Petersburg 1703–1730" (PDF). Geographical Review. 71 (4): 411–426. Bibcode:1981GeoRv..71..411M. doi:10.2307/214506. JSTOR 214506. S2CID 155945755. Archived from the original (PDF) on 2020-02-13.
- "Russia: St. Petersburg", Europe, Let's Go, New York: St. Martin's Press, 1999, p. 757+, OL 15158051W
- "St Petersburg", Scandinavian & Baltic Europe (4th ed.), Lonely Planet, 1999, p. 438+, OL 8314793M
- Olga Gritsai and Herman van der Wusten (2000). "Moscow and St. Petersburg, a sequence of capitals, a tale of two cities". GeoJournal. 51 (1/2): 33–45. Bibcode:2000GeoJo..51...33G. doi:10.1023/A:1010849220006. JSTOR 41147495. S2CID 154264277.
- Duncan Fallowell, One Hot Summer in St Petersburg (London, Jonathan Cape, 1994)

=== Published in 21st century ===
- Julie A. Buckler. Mapping St. Petersburg: Imperial Text and Cityshape. 2005
- George E. Munro. The Most Intentional City: St. Petersburg in the Reign of Catherine the Great. Madison: Farleigh Dickinson University Press, 2008
- Veli-Pekka Tynkkynen (2009). "Planning rationalities among practitioners in St. Petersburg, Russia: Soviet traditions and Western influences". In Jörg Knieling and Frank Othengrafen (ed.). Planning Cultures in Europe: Decoding Cultural Phenomena in Urban and Regional Planning. Ashgate. ISBN 978-0-7546-7565-5.
- Paul Keenan. St Petersburg and the Russian Court, 1703–1761. 2013
- Charles Emerson, 1913: In Search of the World Before the Great War (2013) compares it to 20 major world cities on the eve of World War I; pp 110–132.
- Catriona Kelly. St Petersburg: Shadows of the Past. 2014
- Steven Maddox. Saving Stalin's Imperial City: Historic Preservation in Leningrad. 2014
