= History of Saint Petersburg =

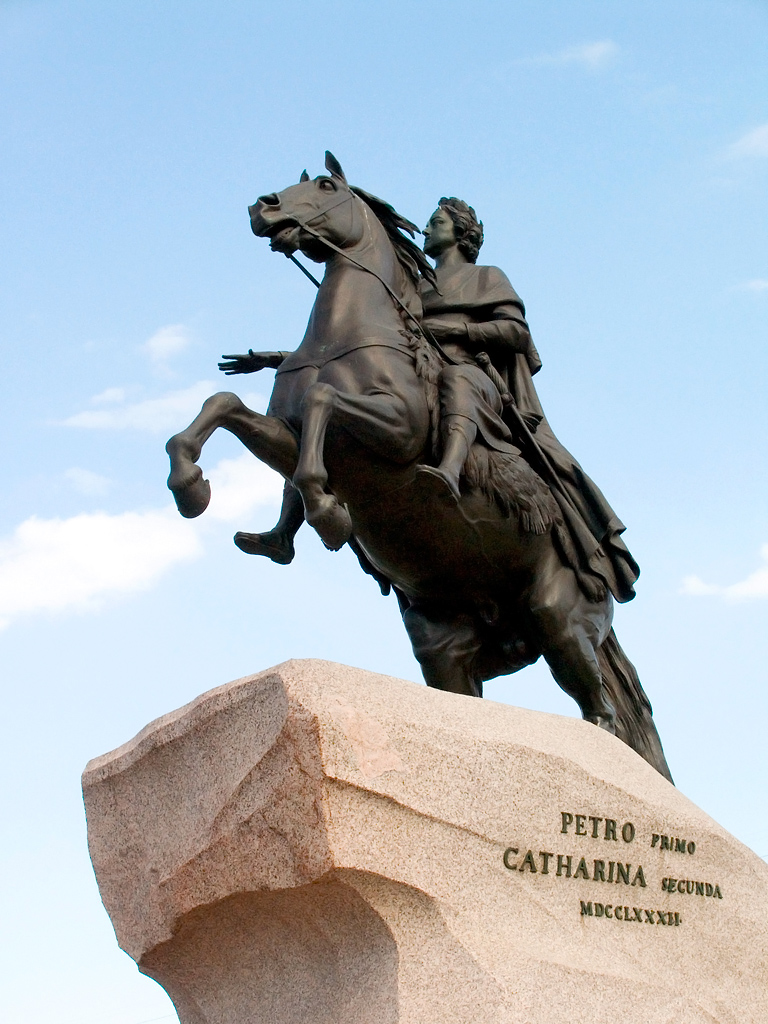
The Bronze Horseman, monument to Peter the Great

The city of Saint Petersburg was founded by Tsar Peter the Great on 27 May 1703. It became the capital of the Russian Empire and remained as such for more than two hundred years (1712–1728, 1732–1918).

== History as capital ==
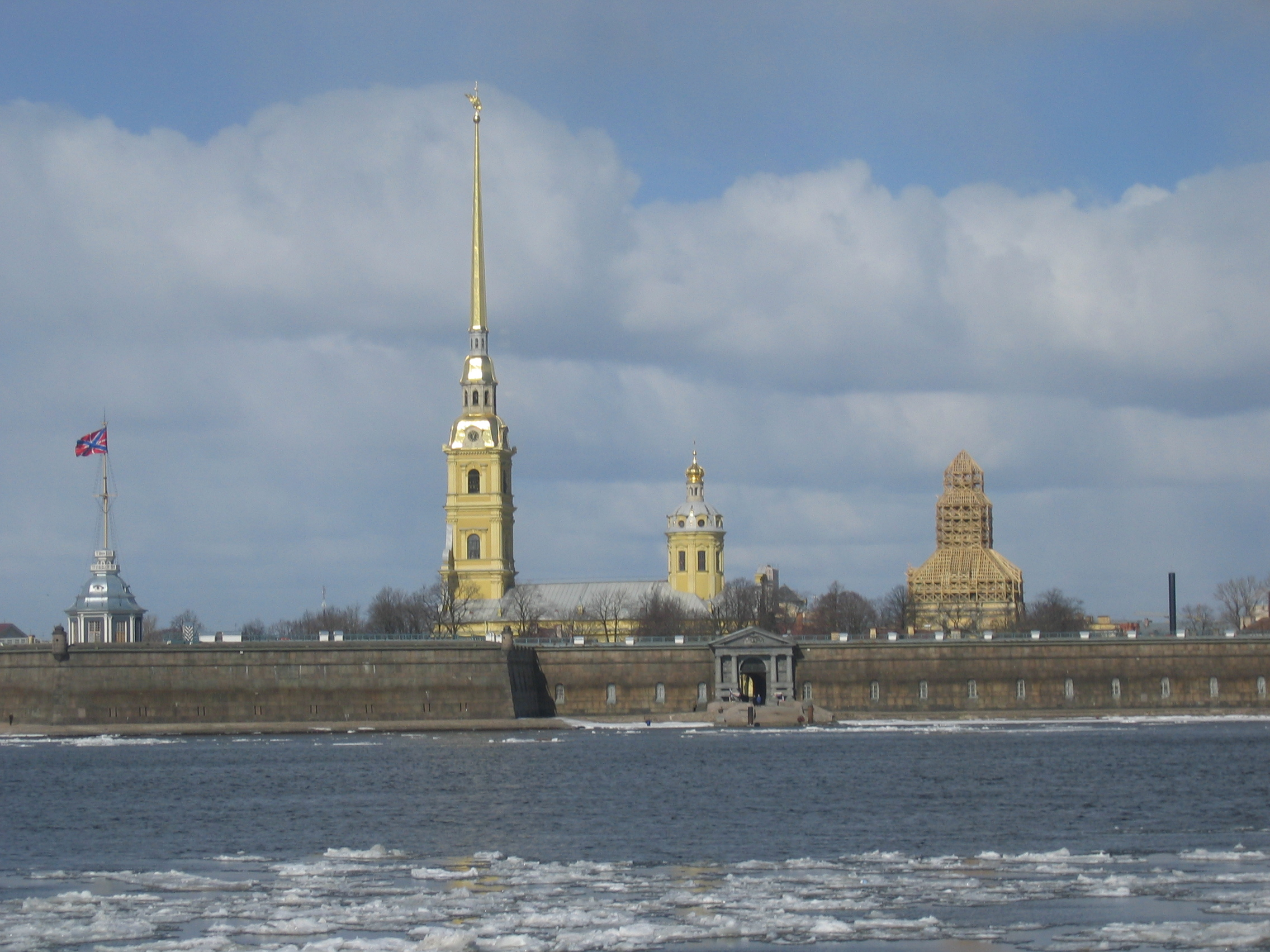
The Peter and Paul Cathedral in Peter and Paul Fortress

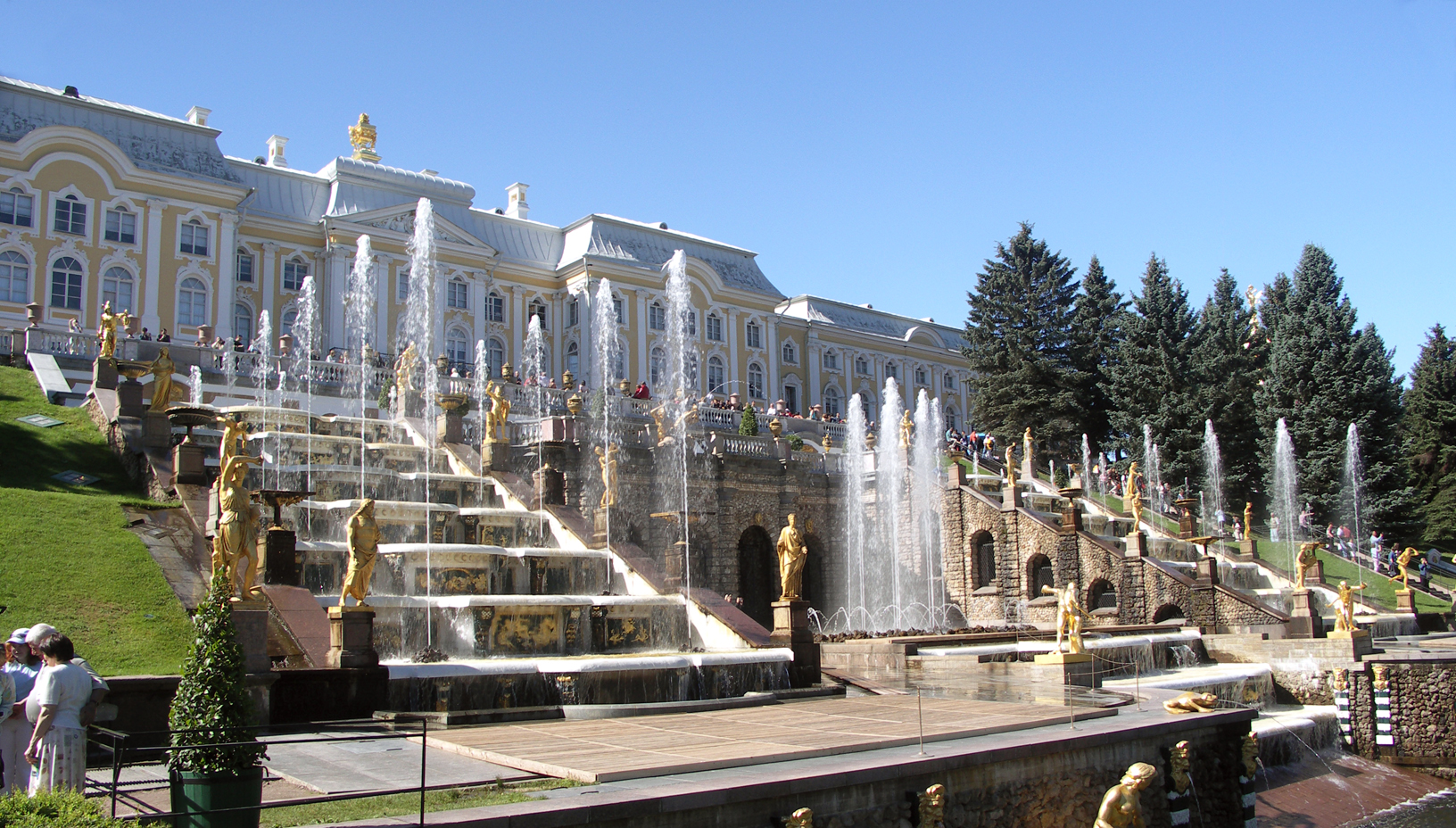
Peter the Great's Palace, built in 1714–1725 in Peterhof

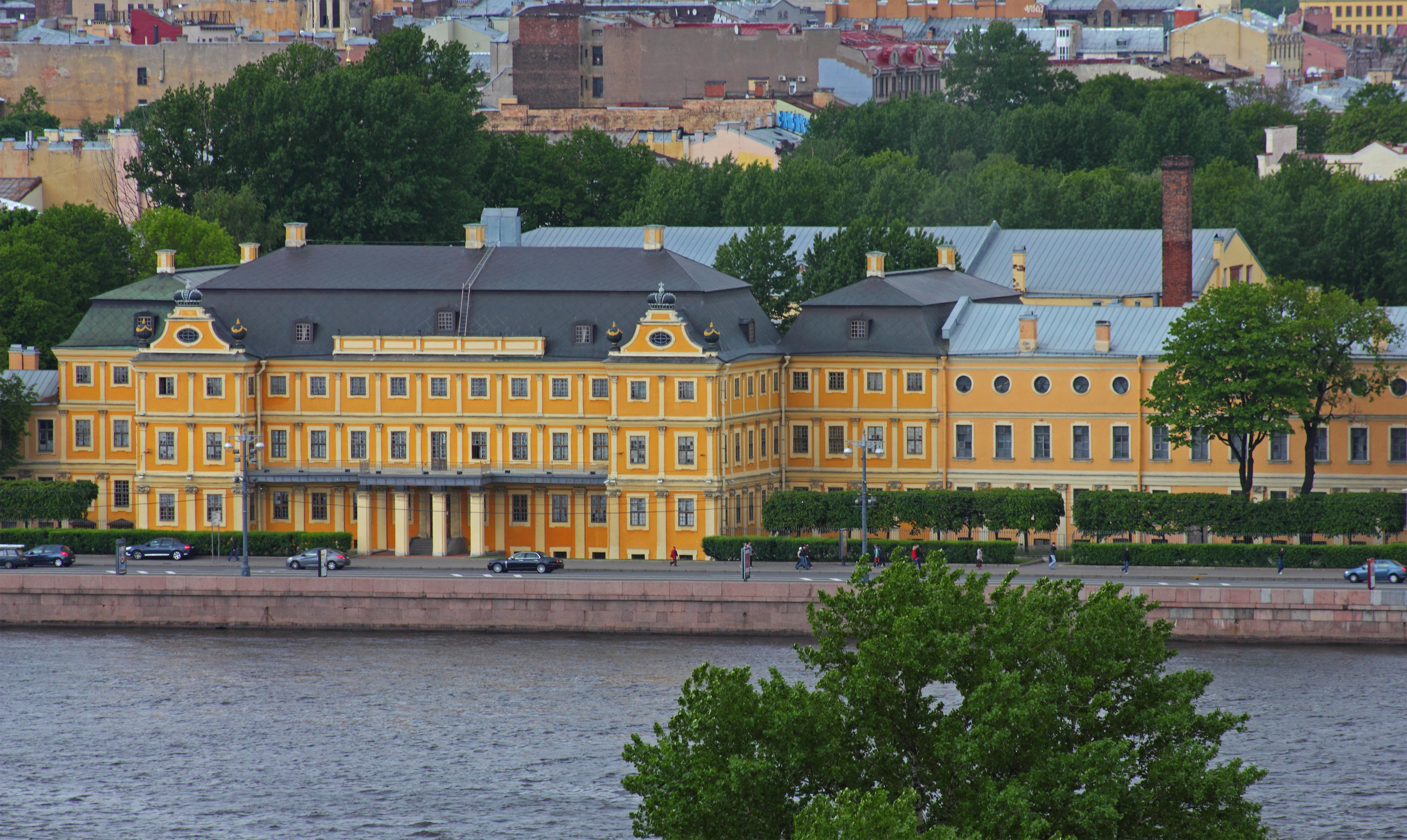
Menshikov Palace, the seat of the first Governor

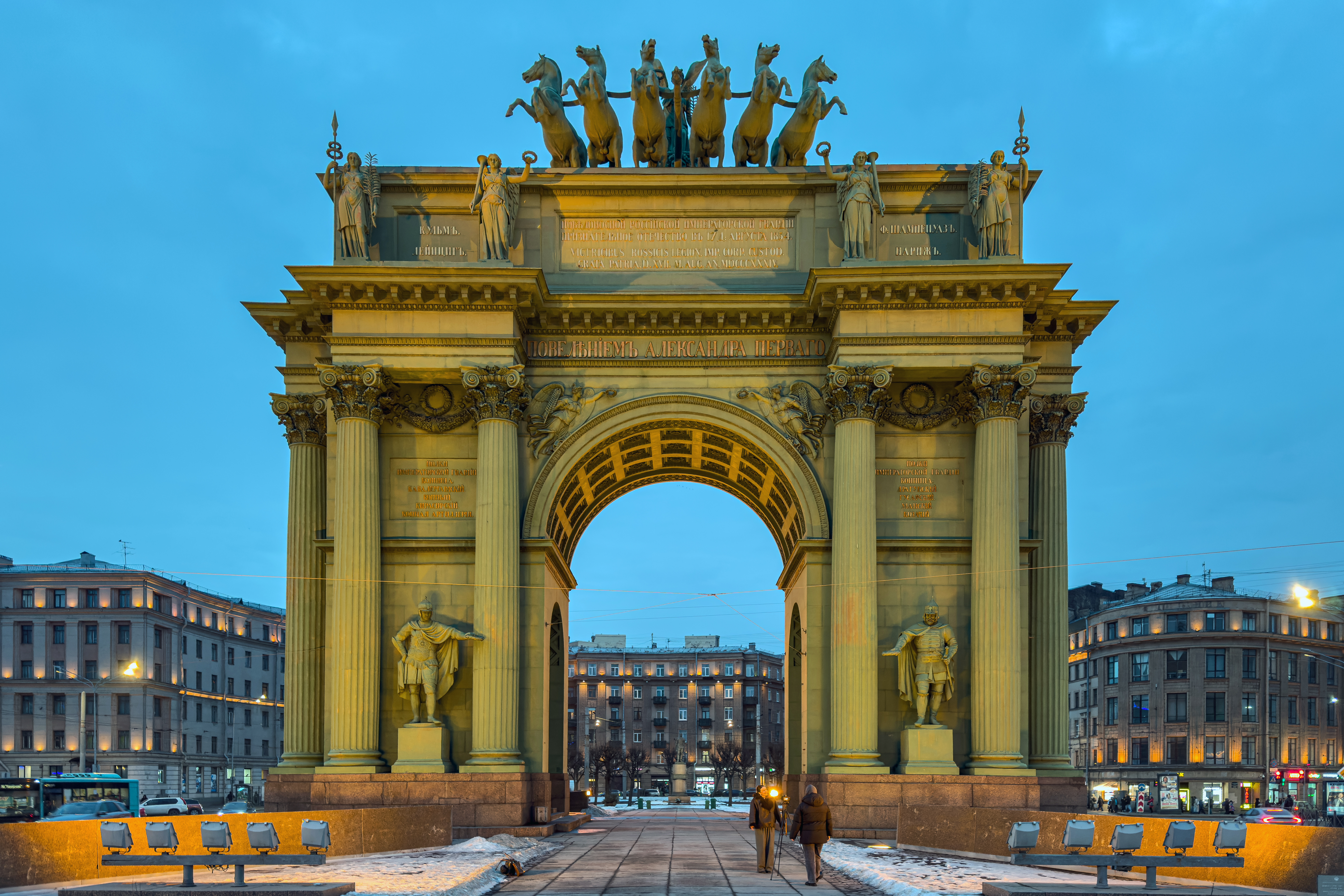
Narva Triumphal Gate at the Stachek Square.

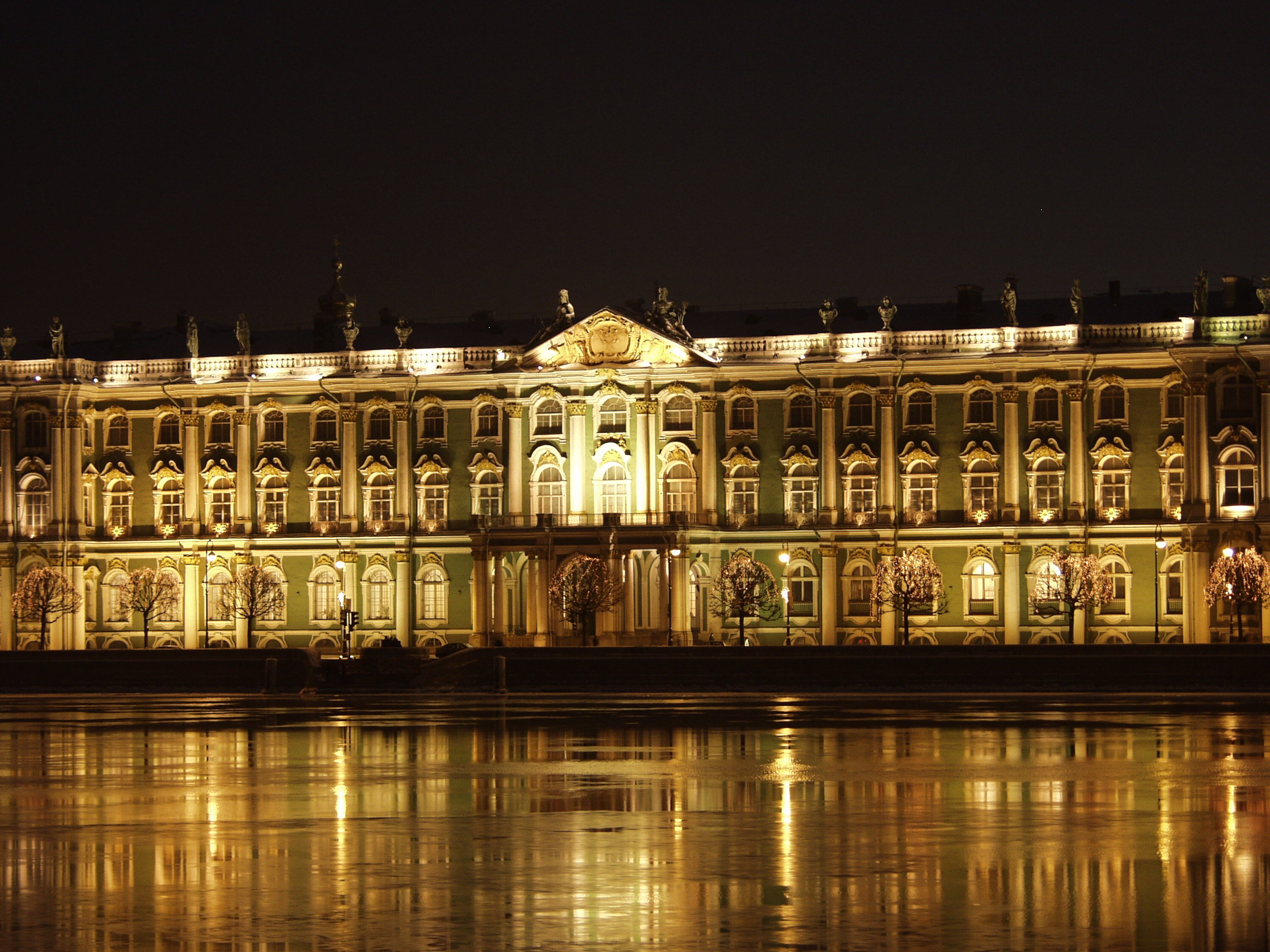
The Winter Palace was stormed by Bolshevik communists at night in October 1917

On 1 May 1703, Peter the Great took both the Swedish fortress of Nyenschantz and the city of Nyen, on the Neva river. Tsar Peter the Great founded the city on 27 May 1703 (in the Gregorian calendar, 16 May in the Julian calendar) after he reconquered the Ingrian land from Sweden, in the Great Northern War. He named the city after his patron saint, the apostle Saint Peter. The original spelling in three words Sankt-Piter-burkh (Санкт-Питер-Бурх) uses Latin: Sankt, as in Sankt Goar and some other European cities (it is a common misconception about the "Dutch cultural origin"; for local versions, there are Sant or Sint in modern Dutch. Besides Netherlands, Peter the Great also spent three months in Great Britain.)

St. Petersburg is actually used as an English equivalent to three variant forms of the name: originally Санкт-Питер-Бурх (Sankt Piter-Burkh), later Санкт-Петерсбурх (Sankt Petersburkh), and then Санкт-Петербург (Sankt Peterburg). The full name is often substituted by the abbreviation SPb (СПб). Sankt was usually confined to writing; people usually called it Петербург (Peterburg) or the common nickname Питер (Piter). Petrograd (Петроград), the name given in 1914 on the outbreak of World War I to avoid the German sound of Petersburg, was a Slavic translation of the previous name. The name was changed to Leningrad (Ленинград) in 1924.

The city was built under adverse weather and geographical conditions. The high mortality rate required a constant supply of workers. Peter ordered a yearly conscription of 40,000 serfs, one conscript for every nine to sixteen households. Conscripts had to provide their own tools and food for the journey of hundreds of kilometres, on foot, in gangs, often escorted by military guards and shackled to prevent desertion, but many escaped; others died from disease and exposure under the harsh conditions.

The new city's first building was the Peter and Paul Fortress, which originally also bore the name of Sankt Petersburg. It was laid down on Zayachy (Hare's) Island, just off the right bank of the Neva, three miles inland from the Gulf. The marshland was drained and the city spread outward from the fortress under the supervision of German and Dutch engineers whom Peter had invited to Russia. Peter restricted the construction of stone buildings in all of Russia outside St Petersburg so that all stonemasons would come to help build the new city.

At the same time Peter hired a large number of engineers, architects, shipbuilders, scientists and businessmen from all countries of Europe. Substantial immigration of educated professionals eventually turned St. Petersburg into a much more cosmopolitan city than Moscow and the rest of Russia. Peter's efforts to push for modernization in Moscow and the rest of Russia were completely misunderstood by the old-fashioned Russian nobility and eventually failed, causing him much trouble with opposition, including several attempts on his life and the treason involving his own son.

Peter moved the capital from Moscow to Saint Petersburg in 1712, nine years before the Treaty of Nystad. Called the "window to Europe", it was a seaport and also a base for Peter's navy, protected by the fortress of Kronstadt. The first person to build a home in Saint Petersburg was Cornelis Cruys, commander of the Baltic Fleet. Inspired by Venice and Amsterdam, Peter the Great proposed boats and coracles as means of transport in his city of canals. Initially there were only 12 permanent bridges over smaller waterways, while the Great Neva was crossed by boats in the summertime and by foot or horse carriages during winter. A pontoon bridge over Neva was built every summer.

Peter was impressed by the Versailles and other palaces in Europe. His official palace of a comparable importance in Peterhof was the first suburban palace permanently used by the Tsar as the primary official residence and the place for official receptions and state balls. The waterfront palace, Monplaisir, and the Great Peterhof Palace were built between 1714 and 1725. In 1716, Prussia's King presented a gift to Tsar Peter: the Amber Room.

Aleksandr Danilovich Menshikov, Peter's best friend, was the first Governor General of Saint Petersburg Governorate in 1703–1727. In 1724 St. Petersburg Academy of Sciences was established in the city. After the death of Peter the Great, Menshikov was arrested and exiled to Siberia. In 1728 Peter II of Russia moved the capital back to Moscow, but four years later, in 1732, St. Petersburg again became the capital of Russia and remained the seat of the government for about two centuries.

== Revolutions ==
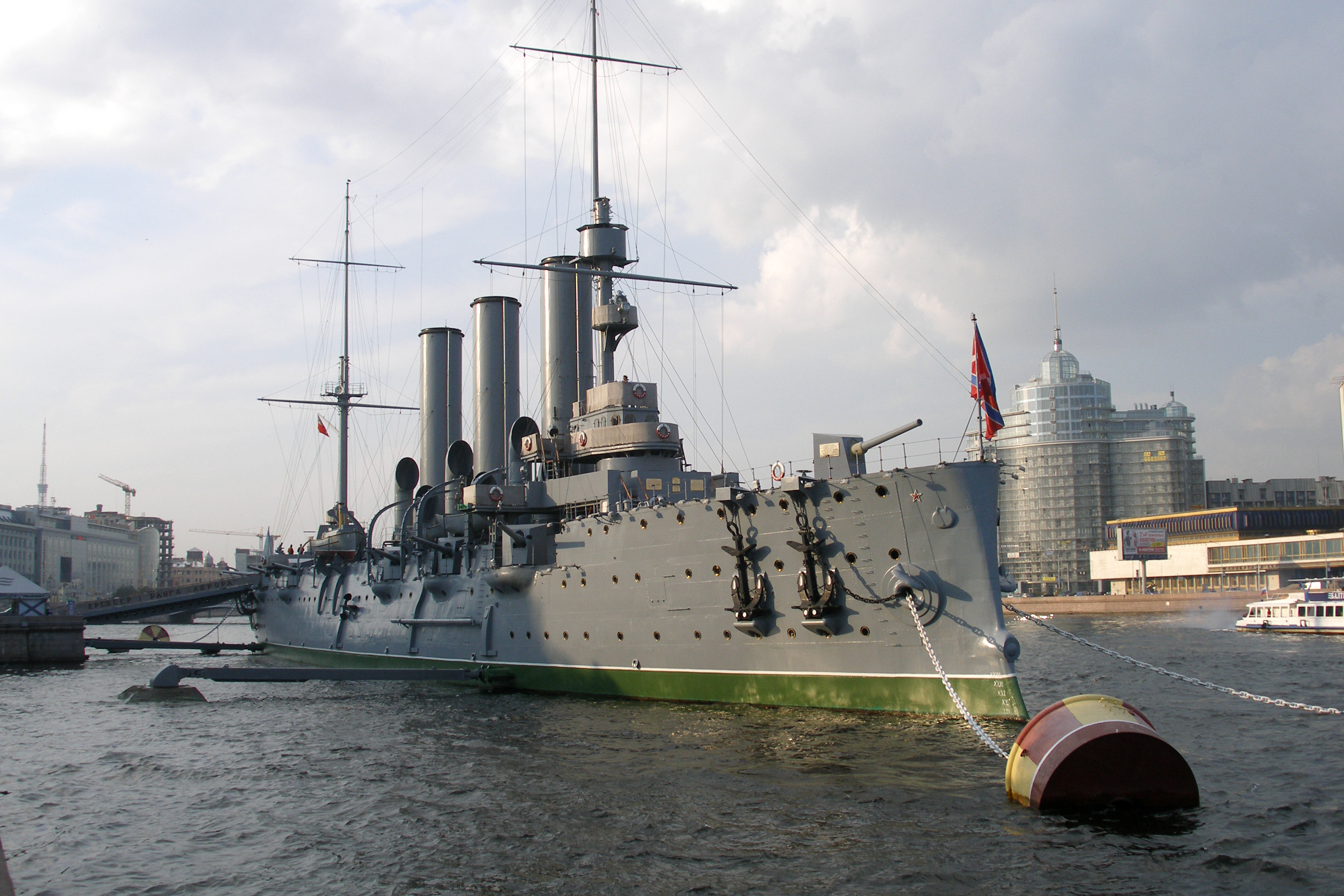
The protected cruiser Aurora, symbol of the October Revolution, now a museum

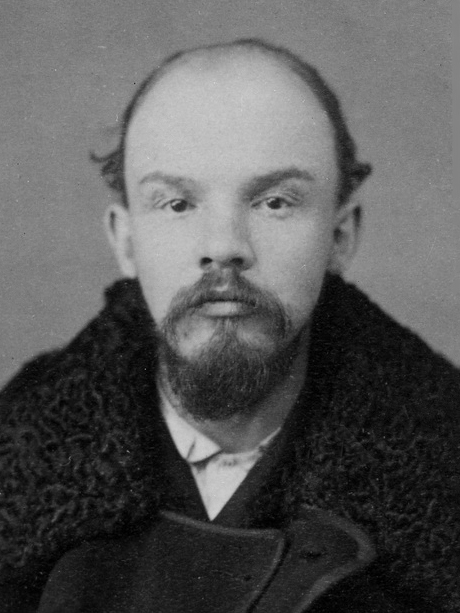
Lenin's mug shot 1895

Several revolutions, uprisings, assassinations of tsars, and power takeovers in St. Peterburg had shaped the course of history in Russia and influenced the world. In 1801, after the assassination of the Emperor Paul I, his son became the Emperor Alexander I. Alexander I ruled Russia during the Napoleonic Wars and expanded his Empire by acquisitions of Finland and part of Poland. His mysterious death in 1825 was marked by the Decembrist revolt, which was suppressed by the Emperor Nicholas I, who ordered execution of leaders and exiled hundreds of their followers to Siberia. Nicholas I then pushed for Russian nationalism by suppressing non-Russian nationalities and religions.

The cultural revolution that followed after the Napoleonic wars further opened St. Petersburg up, in spite of repression. The city's wealth and rapid growth had always attracted prominent intellectuals, scientists, writers and artists. St. Petersburg eventually gained international recognition as a gateway for trade and business, as well as a cosmopolitan cultural hub. The works of Aleksandr Pushkin, Nikolai Gogol, Ivan Turgenev, Fyodor Dostoyevsky and numerous others brought Russian literature to the world. Music, theatre and ballet became firmly established and gained international stature.

The son of Emperor Nicholas I, Emperor Alexander II, implemented the most challenging reforms undertaken in Russia since the reign of Peter the Great. The emancipation of the serfs (1861) caused the influx of large numbers of poor into the capital. Tenements were erected on the outskirts, and nascent industry sprang up, surpassing Moscow in population and industrial growth. By 1900, St. Petersburg had grown into one of the largest industrial hubs in Europe, an important international center of power, business and politics, and the fourth largest city in Europe.

The Church of the Savior on Blood commemorates the spot where Tsar Alexander II was assassinated

With the growth of industry, radical movements were also astir. Socialist organizations were responsible for the assassinations of many public figures, government officials, members of the royal family, and the tsar himself. Tsar Alexander II was killed by suicide bomber Ignacy Hryniewiecki in 1881, in a plot with connections to the family of Lenin and other revolutionaries. The Revolution of 1905 initiated here and spread rapidly into the provinces. During World War I, the name Sankt Peterburg was seen to be too German, so the city was renamed Petrograd.

1917 saw the next stages of the Russian Revolution and the re-emergence of the Communist party led by Lenin, who declared "guns give us the power" and "all power to the Soviets!" After the February Revolution, Tsar Nicholas II was arrested and the Tsar's government was replaced by two opposing centers of political power: the "pro-democracy" Provisional government and the "pro-communist" Petrograd Soviet. Then the Provisional government was overthrown by the communists in the October Revolution, causing the Russian Civil War.

The city's proximity to anti-Soviet armies forced communist leader Vladimir Lenin to move his government to Moscow on 5 March 1918. The move was disguised as temporary, but Moscow has remained the capital ever since. On 24 January 1924, three days after Lenin's death, Petrograd was renamed Leningrad. The Communist party's reason for renaming the city again was that Lenin had led the revolution. After the Civil War, and murder of the Tsar Nicholas II and his family, as well as millions of anti-Soviet people, the renaming to Leningrad was designed to destroy last hopes among the resistance, and show strong dictatorship of Lenin's communist party and the Soviet regime.

St. Petersburg was devastated by Lenin's Red Terror then by Stalin's Great Purge in addition to crime and vandalism in the series of revolutions and wars. Between 1917 and 1930s, about two million people fled the city, including hundreds of thousands of educated intellectuals and aristocracy, who emigrated to Europe and America. At the same time many political, social and paramilitary groups had followed the communist government in their move to Moscow, as the benefits of capital status had left the city. In 1931 Leningrad administratively separated from Leningrad Oblast.

In 1934 the popular governor of Leningrad, Kirov, was assassinated, because Stalin apparently became increasingly paranoid about Kirov's the growth of his popularity. The death of Kirov was used to ignite the Great Purge where supporters of Trotsky and other suspected "enemies of the Soviet state" were arrested. Then a series of "criminal" cases, known as the Leningrad Centre and Leningrad Affair, were fabricated and resulted in death sentences for many top leaders of Leningrad, and severe repressions of thousands of top officials and intellectuals.

== Siege of Leningrad ==
During World War II, Leningrad was surrounded and besieged by the German Wehrmacht from 8 September 1941 to 27 January 1944, a total of 29 months. By Hitler's order the Wehrmacht constantly shelled and bombed the city and systematically isolated it from any supplies, causing death of more than 1 million civilians in three years; 650,000 died in 1942 alone. The secret instruction from 23 September 1941 said: "the Führer is determined to eliminate the city of Petersburg from the face of earth. There is no reason whatsoever for subsequent existence of this large-scale city after the neutralization of the Soviet Russia." Starting in early 1942, Ingria was included into the Generalplan Ost annexation plans as the "German settlement area". This implied the genocide of 3 million Leningrad residents, who had no place in Hitler's "New East European Order".

Hitler ordered preparations for victory celebrations at the tsar's palaces. The Germans looted art from museums and palaces, as well as from private homes. All looted treasures, such as the Amber Room, gold statues of the Peterhof Palace, paintings and other valuable art were taken to Germany. Hitler also prepared a party to celebrate his victory at the hotel Astoria. A printed invitation to Hitler's reception ball at the Hotel Astoria is now on display at the City Museum of St. Petersburg.

During the siege of 1941–1944, the only ways to supply the city and suburbs, inhabited by several millions, were by aircraft or by cars crossing the frozen Lake Ladoga. The German military systematically shelled this route, called the Road of Life, so thousands of cars with people and food supplies had sunk in the lake. The situation in the city was especially horrible in the winter of 1941–1942. The German bombing raids destroyed most of the food reserves. The daily food ration was cut in October to 400 grams of bread for a worker and 200 grams for a woman or child. On 20 November 1941, the rations were reduced to 250 and 125 grams respectively. Those grams of bread were the bulk of a daily meal for a person in the city. The water supply was destroyed. The situation further worsened in winter due to lack of heating fuel. In December 1941 alone some 53,000 people in Leningrad died of starvation, many corpses were scattered in the streets all over the city.

"Savichevs died. Everyone died. Only Tanya is left," wrote 11-year-old Leningrad girl Tanya Savicheva in her diary. It became one of the symbols of the blockade tragedy and was shown as one of many documents at the Nuremberg trials.

The city suffered severe destruction – the Wehrmacht fired about 150,000 shells at Leningrad and the Luftwaffe dropped about 100,000 air bombs. Many houses, schools, hospitals and other buildings were leveled, and those in the occupied territory were plundered by German troops.

As a result of the siege, about 1.2 million of 3 million Leningrad civilians lost their lives because of bombardment, starvation, infections and stress. Hundreds of thousands of unregistered civilians, who lived in Leningrad prior to WWII, had perished in the siege without any record at all. About 1 million civilians escaped with evacuation, mainly by foot. After two years of the siege, Leningrad became an empty ghost town with thousands of ruined and abandoned homes.

For the heroic resistance of the city and tenacity of the survivors of the siege, Leningrad became the first to receive the Hero City title, as awarded in 1945.

== Postwar reconstruction ==
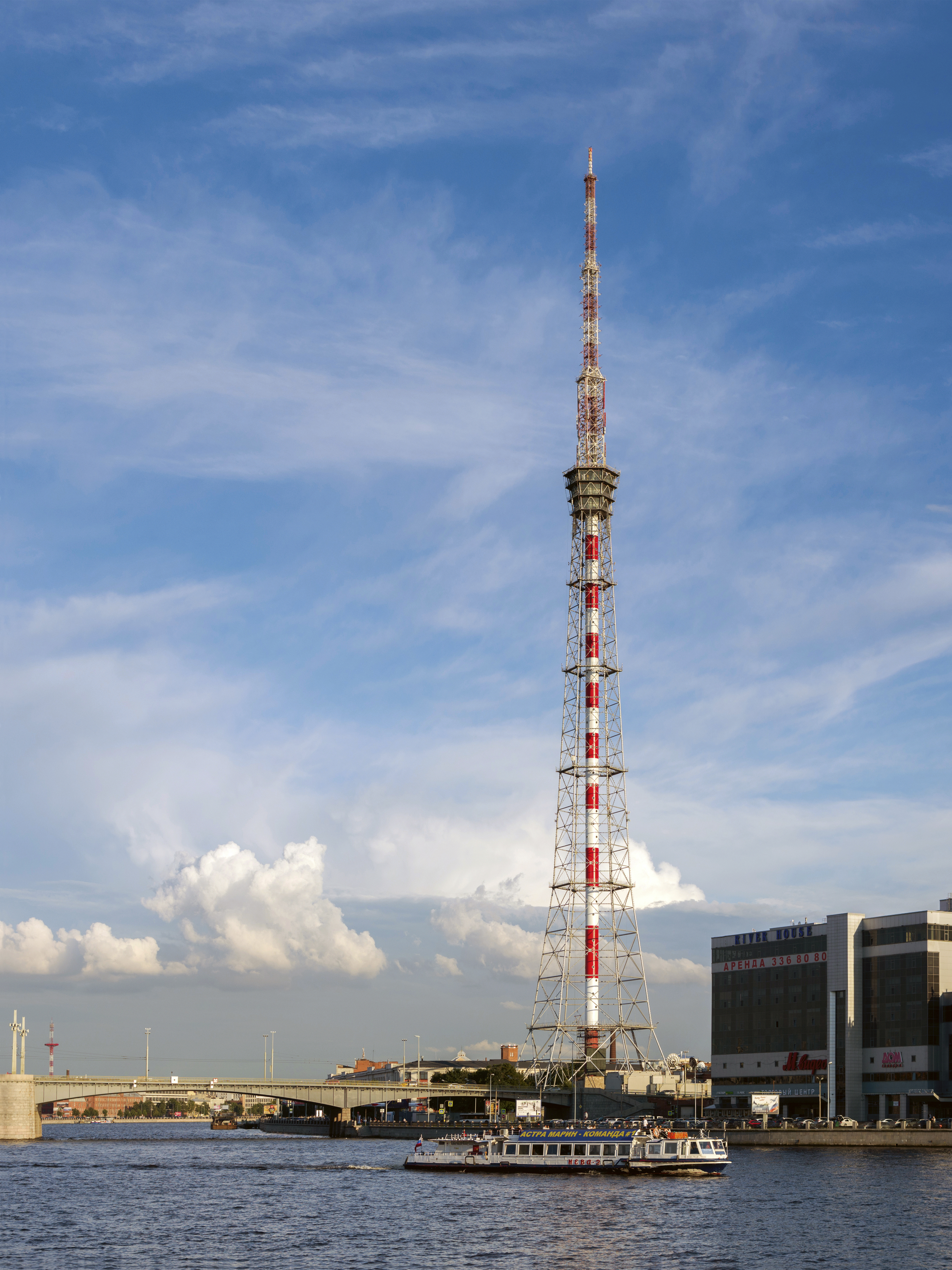
Saint Petersburg TV Tower (326 m high)

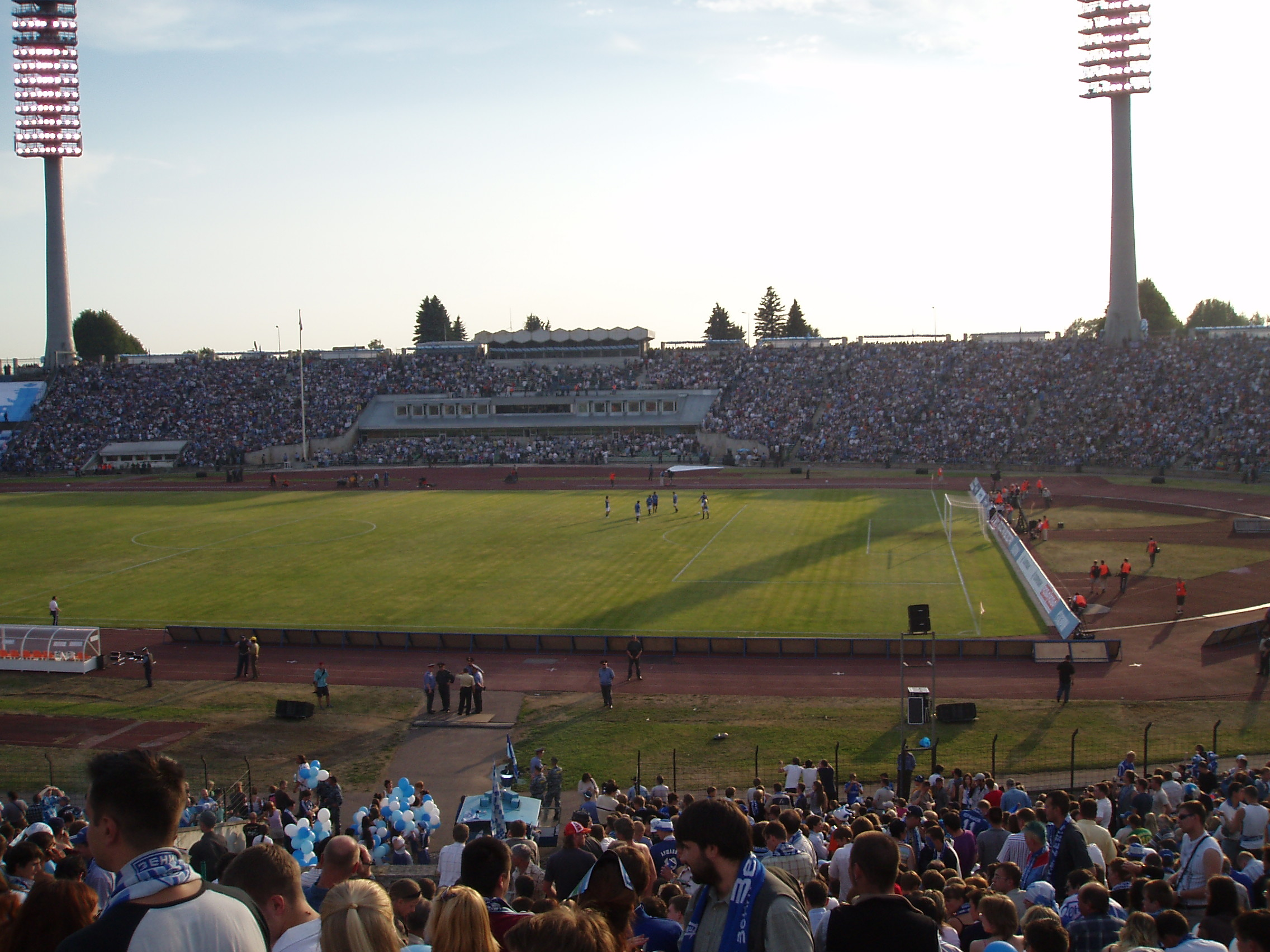
Kirov Stadium

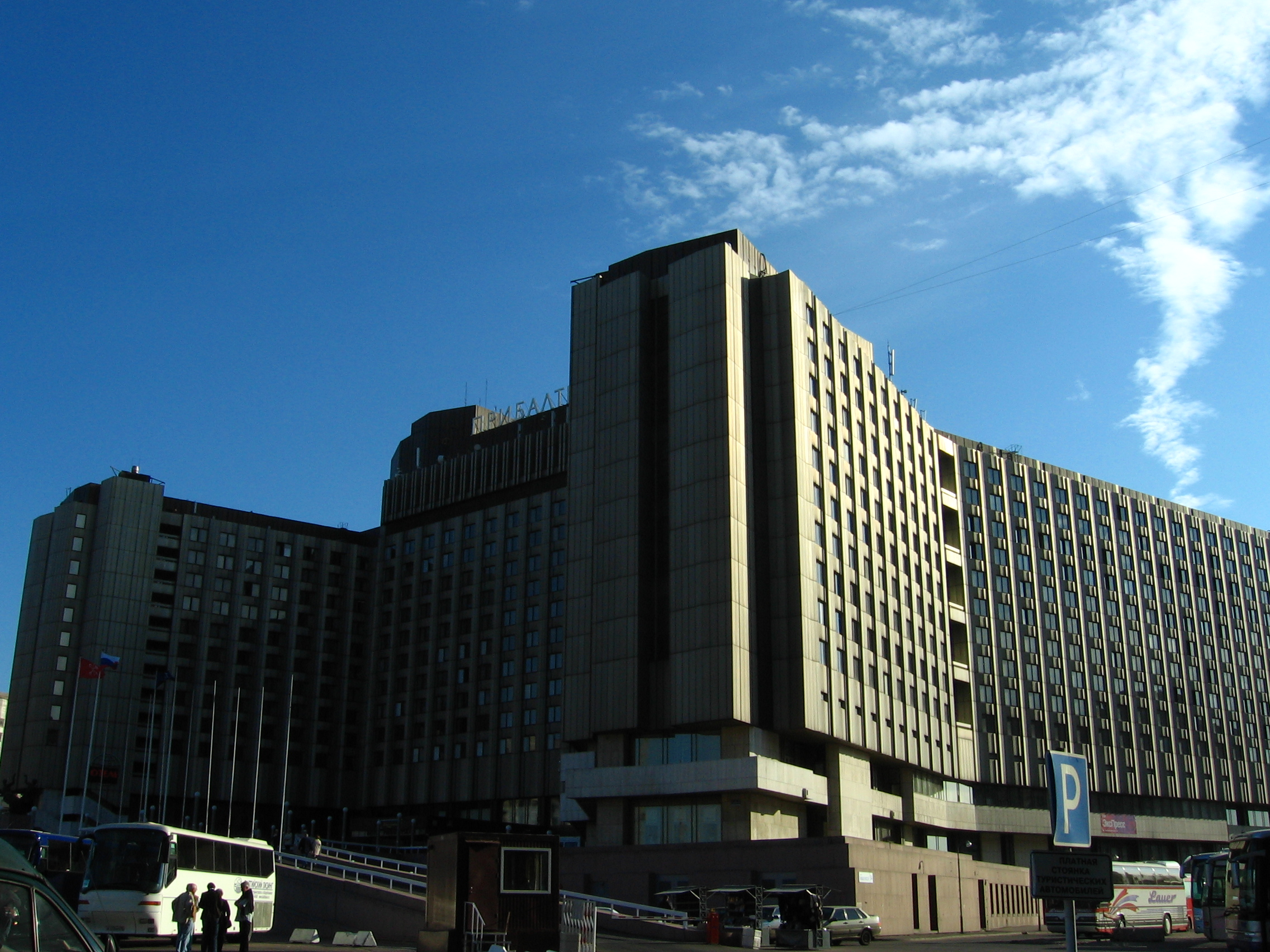
Hotel Pribaltiyskaya

The war damaged the city and killed many old Petersburgers who had not fled after the revolution and did not perish in the mass purges before the war. Nonetheless, Leningrad and many of its suburbs were rebuilt over the post-war decades, partially according to the pre-war plans. In 1950 the Kirov Stadium was opened and soon set a record when 110,000 fans attended a football match. In 1955 the Leningrad Metro, the second underground rapid transit system in the country, was opened with its first six stations decorated with marble and bronze.

=== Timeline of post-war recovery ===
==== 1945–1970s ====
- Re-building and restoration of thousands of buildings, industries, schools, transport, energy supplies and infrastructure.
- Restoration of destroyed suburban museums, palaces, and other historic and cultural landmarks and treasures.
- Explosions of left behind land mines caused numerous deaths among citizens.

==== 1946 ====
- January – December: some schools, universities, and colleges reopened.
- January – December: some theatres and movies were opened to the public.

==== 1947 ====
- May: The fountains of Peterhof park were opened to the public again, but the palaces were in ruins for the next several decades.

==== 1949 ====
Stalin set up a plot to have the leaders of the city government arrested and killed. Aleksei Kuznetsov, Nikolai Voznesensky, P. Popkov, Ya. Kapustin, P. Lazutin, and several more, who were heroic and efficient in defending Leningrad, became very popular figures. They were arrested on false accusations. Stalin's plot to kill the leaders of Leningrad was kept top-secret in the former Soviet Union. It is now known as the Leningrad Affair.

==== 1955 ====
- Leningrad Metro, which was designed before the war in the 1930s to serve as an underground shelter, was completed after the war and opened in 1955 with its first seven stations decorated with marble and bronze. It became the second underground rapid transit system in the country.
- The population of Leningrad, including suburbs, increased in the 10 post-war years from under 0.8 million to about 4 million.

==== 1960s ====
- The Ilya Repin House Museum is restored in the northern suburb of Repino, and open to the public. However, most of the artist's original paintings and personal items remain missing since the Finnish army was there during WWII.

==== 1970s ====
- The Memorial to Defenders and Survivors of the Siege of Leningrad is erected at the former defence lines on Moskovsky Prospekt near Pulkovo Airport.

==== 2003 ====
- May: the Amber Room was re-created with the sponsorship of Germany. It is open to the public in the completely restored Catherine Palace.
- 27–31 May marked the 300-year anniversary of the city.

==== 2004 ====
- January: the 60th anniversary of the Lifting of the Siege of Leningrad in 1944 was officially celebrated in St. Petersburg on 27 January 2004. About twelve thousand survivors of the siege who were children at the time of WWII, are now living on a state pension in St. Petersburg and suburbs. Tens of thousands of other survivors, who were evacuated from besieged Leningrad as children, are still living in Russia and other countries across the world.

== Postwar history ==
During the late 1940s and 1950s the political and cultural elite of Leningrad suffered from more harsh repression under the dictatorship of Stalin – hundreds were executed and thousands were imprisoned in what became known as the Leningrad Affair. Independent thinkers, writers, artists and other intellectuals were attacked, the magazines Zvezda and Leningrad were banned, Akhmatova and Zoshchenko were repressed, and tens of thousands of Leningraders were exiled to Siberia. More crackdowns on Leningrad's intellectual elite, known as the Second Leningrad affair, were part of the economic policies of the Soviet state. Leningrad's economy was producing about 6% of the USSR GNP, despite having less than 2% of the country's population, but the Soviet Communist Party negated such economic efficiency and diverted the earned income from the people of Leningrad to other Soviet places and programs. As a result, during the 1960s, 1970s and 1980s, the city of Leningrad was seriously underfunded in favor of Moscow, and the city subsidised other parts of the Soviet Union. This redistribution of wealth caused struggles within the Soviet government and communist party, which led to their fragmentation and played a role in the eventual collapse of the USSR.

On 12 June 1991, the day of the first Russian presidential election, in a referendum 54% of Leningrad voters chose to restore "the original name, Saint Petersburg", on 6 September 1991. In the same election Anatoly Sobchak became the first democratically elected mayor of the city. Among his first initiatives, Sobchak attempted to minimise Moscow's federal control to keep the income from St. Petersburg's economy in the city.

Original names were returned to 39 streets, six bridges, three Saint Petersburg Metro stations and six parks. Older people sometimes use old names and old mailing addresses. The media heavily promoted the name Leningrad, mainly in connection with the siege, so even authorities may refer to Saint Petersburg as the "Hero city Leningrad". Young people may use Leningrad as a vague protest against social and economic changes. A popular ska punk band from Saint Petersburg is called Leningrad.

Leningrad Oblast retained its name after a popular vote. It is a separate federal subject of Russia of which the city of St. Petersburg is the capital.

In 1996, Vladimir Yakovlev was elected the head of the Saint Petersburg City Administration, and changed his title from mayor to governor. In 2003 Yakovlev resigned a year before his second term expired. Valentina Matviyenko was elected governor. In 2006 the city legislature re-appointed her as governor.

The Constitutional Court of Russia completed its move from Moscow to Senate Square in St. Petersburg in 2008. The move partially restored Saint Petersburg's historic status, making the city Russia's second judicial capital.

== See also ==
- Timeline of Saint Petersburg

== Bibliography ==
- Amery, Colin, Brian Curran & Yuri Molodkovets. St. Petersburg. (Frances Lincoln, 2006).
- Anokhin, A. A., et al. "Post-Soviet urban environment: the experience of St. Petersburg." Regional research of Russia 7.3 (2017): 249–258. online
- Barskova, Polina. "The Spectacle of the Besieged City: Repurposing Cultural Memory in Leningrad, 1941–1944." Slavic Review (2010): 327–355. online
- Bater, James H. St. Petersburg: Industrialization and Change. (McGuill-Queen's University Press, 1976).
- Brumfield, William Craft. The Origins of Modernism in Russian Architecture. Berkeley: University of California Press, 1991.
- Buckler, Julie. Mapping St. Petersburg: Imperial Text and Cityshape. Princeton: Princeton University Press, 2005).
- Clapperton, James. "The siege of Leningrad as sacred narrative: conversations with survivors." Oral History (2007): 49–60. online, primary sources
- Clark, Katerina. Petersburg, Crucible of Revolution. Cambridge: Harvard University Press, 1995.
- Cross, Anthony, ed. St. Petersburg, 1703–1825. (Palgrave Macmillan, 2003).
- Cross, Anthony. By the Banks of the Neva: Chapters from the Lives and Careers of the British in Eighteenth-Century Russia. Cambridge University Press, 1997.
- George, Arthur L. & Elena George. St. Petersburg: Russia's Window to the Future, The First Three Centuries. Lanham: Taylor Trade Publishing, 2003. ISBN 1-58979-017-0.
- Glantz, David M. The Battle for Leningrad, 1941–1944. (UP of Kansas, 2002).
- Hare, Richard. "St. Petersburg Petrograd Leningrad 1703-1953" History Today (Dec 1953) 3#12 pp 823–834. popular
- Hughes, Lindsey. Peter the Great: a Biography (Yale UP, 2004) pp 203–247.
- Hwang, Kiun. Framing, Walking, and Reimagining Landscapes in a Post-Soviet St. Petersburg: Cultural Heritage, Cinema, and Identity (PhD Diss. U of Pittsburgh, 2020) online .
- Jones, Michael. Leningrad: State of siege (Basic Books, 2008).
- Kelly, Catriona. "'The Hermitage and My Own Front Door': Local Identities in St. Petersburg." Ab Imperio 2010.4 (2010): 463-505. online
- Keenan, Paul. St Petersburg and the Russian court, 1703-1761 (Springer, 2013).
- Kirschenbaum, Lisa. "Remembering and Rebuilding: Leningrad after the Siege from a Comparative Perspective." Journal of Modern European History 9.3 (2011): 314-327. online
- Kirschenbaum, Lisa A. The Legacy of the Siege of Leningrad, 1941–1995: Myth, Memories, and Monuments (Cambridge UP, 2006).
- Klapuri, Tintti. "Literary St. Petersburg in Contemporary Russian Transnational Writing: Anya Ulinich, Gary Shteyngart, and Zinaida Lindén." Scando-Slavica 62.2 (2016): 235-248.
- Lincoln, W. Bruce. Sunlight at Midnight: St. Petersburg and the Rise of Modern Russia. (Basic Books, 2000).
- Maddox, Steven M. Saving Stalin's Imperial City: Historic Preservation in Leningrad, 1930-1950 (Indiana UP, 2014).
  - Maddox, Steven. "Healing the Wounds: Commemorations, Myths, and the Restoration of Leningrad's Imperial Heritage, 1941-1950" (PhD dissertation, University of Toronto, 2008) online
- Miles, Jonathan. St. Petersburg (2019), cultural history.
- Morel, Thierry and Elizaveta Renne. The Splendor of St. Petersburg: Art & Life in Late Imperial Palaces of Russia (2019) excerpt
- Munro, George E. The most intentional city: St. Petersburg in the reign of Catherine the Great (Associated University Presse, 2008).
- Orttung, Robert W. From Leningrad to St. Petersburg: Democratization in a Russian City. (St. Martin's, 1995).
- Ruble, Blair A. Leningrad: Shaping a Soviet City. (U of California Press, 1990).
- Ruble, Blair A. “The Leningrad Affair and the Provincialization of Leningrad.” Russian Review 42#3 (1983), pp. 301–320. online
- Salisbury, Harrison. The 900 days: The siege of Leningrad (1969) excerpt
- Scollins, Kathleen. Acts of Logos in Pushkin and Gogol: Petersburg Texts and Subtexts (Academic Studies Press, 2017).
- Shapiro, I͡U. G. The Hermitage Leningrad picture gallery: a guide (1989) online
- Shvidkovsky, Dmitry O. & Alexander Orloff. St. Petersburg: Architecture of the Tsars. (Abbeville Press, 1996).
- Varga-Harris, Christine. Stories of house and home: Soviet apartment life during the Khrushchev years (Cornell UP, 2015).
- Volkov, Solomon. St. Petersburg: A Cultural History.(Free Press, 1995) online.
- Woodworth, Bradley, Constance Richards, and Harold Bloom. St. Petersburg (Infobase Publishing, 2005).
- Zlatar, Zdenko. "'For the Sake of Slavdom': St. Petersburg Slavic Benevolent Society-A Collective Portrait of 1913." East European Quarterly 38.3 (2004): 261+.
