= Gaetano Ciniselli =

Italian circus proprietor (1815-1881)

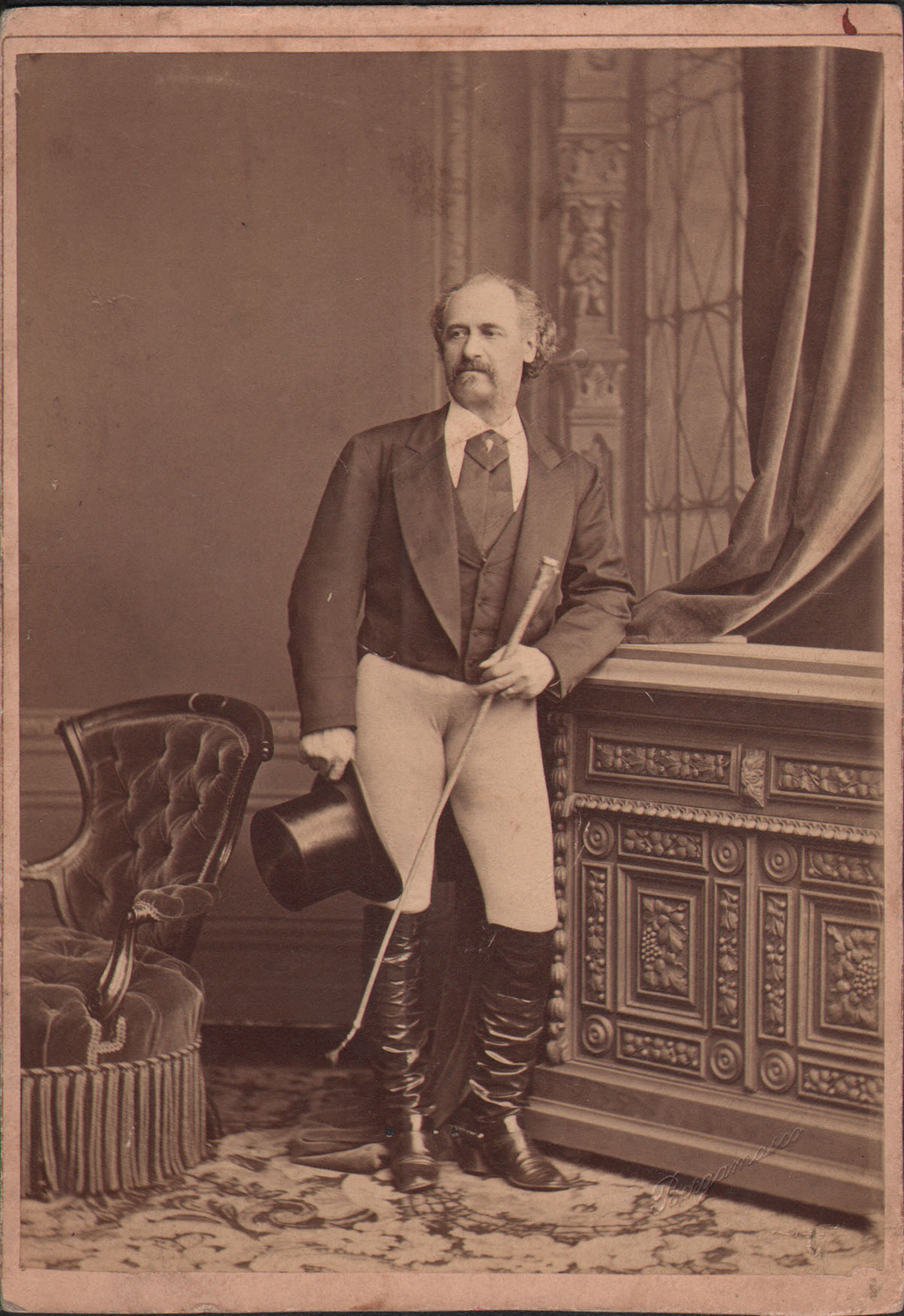
- Photo by Charles Bergamasco, 1870
- Born: Gaetano Ciniselli; March 1, 1815; Milan, Italy
- Died: October 4, 1881 (aged 66); Saint Petersburg, Russia
- Resting place: Smolensky Lutheran Cemetery
- Occupation: Circus proprietor
- Known for: Ciniselli Circus
- Spouse: Wilhelmina Hinné
- Children: 4
- Awards: Knight of the Order of the Crown of Italy (1868)

Gaetano Ciniselli (March 1, 1815 – October 4, 1881) was an Italian-born equestrian performer, horse trainer, and circus proprietor. He was the director of the Ciniselli Circus.

== Early life ==
Gaetano Ciniselli was born on March 1, 1815, in Milan, Italy.

== Career ==
Gaetano Ciniselli began his career as an equestrian acrobat. At a young age, he joined the equestrian company of Alessandro Guerra. He later became a pupil of François Baucher at the Cirque Olympique. After working with the Franconi circus in Paris, he returned with Alessandro Guerra.

Ciniselli first travelled to Saint Petersburg with the Guerra troupe in 1845. He found himself back in Milan amid the revolutions of 1848 in the Italian states. Afterward, he partnered with equestrian F. Dumos and journeyed to Switzerland alongside him. From that point forward, he served as director and leader of equestrian enterprises.

He partnered with Carlos Price in October 1859. Gaetano Ciniselli opened his Gran Circo Real in a temporary structure in Barcelona during September 1860.

Gaetano's reputation had become so significant by the early 1860s that Victor Emmanuel II, first king of a unified Italy, invited him to train horses at the royal stables. He was granted the honorary position of Master of Horse.

In 1864, he opened his own circus in Milan, then returned to Saint Petersburg in 1869 at the behest of Carl Magnus Hinné, his brother-in-law.

He established the Ciniselli Circus (now the Bolshoi Saint Petersburg State Circus) in 1877 in Saint Petersburg. Built along the Fontanka Embankment, it was the first permanent circus building in Russia. He introduced Saint Petersburg audiences to Europe's finest performers and pantomime artists.

== Personal life ==
He had four children: Emma, Andrea, Scipione, and Ernesto.

== Death ==
Gaetano Ciniselli died on October 4, 1881, in St. Petersburg, Russia, at age 66.

His death came just four years after the circus was built, prompting his wife, Wilhelmina Hinné, to take the reins of management. She was eventually succeeded by their firstborn son, Andrea.

== Gallery ==
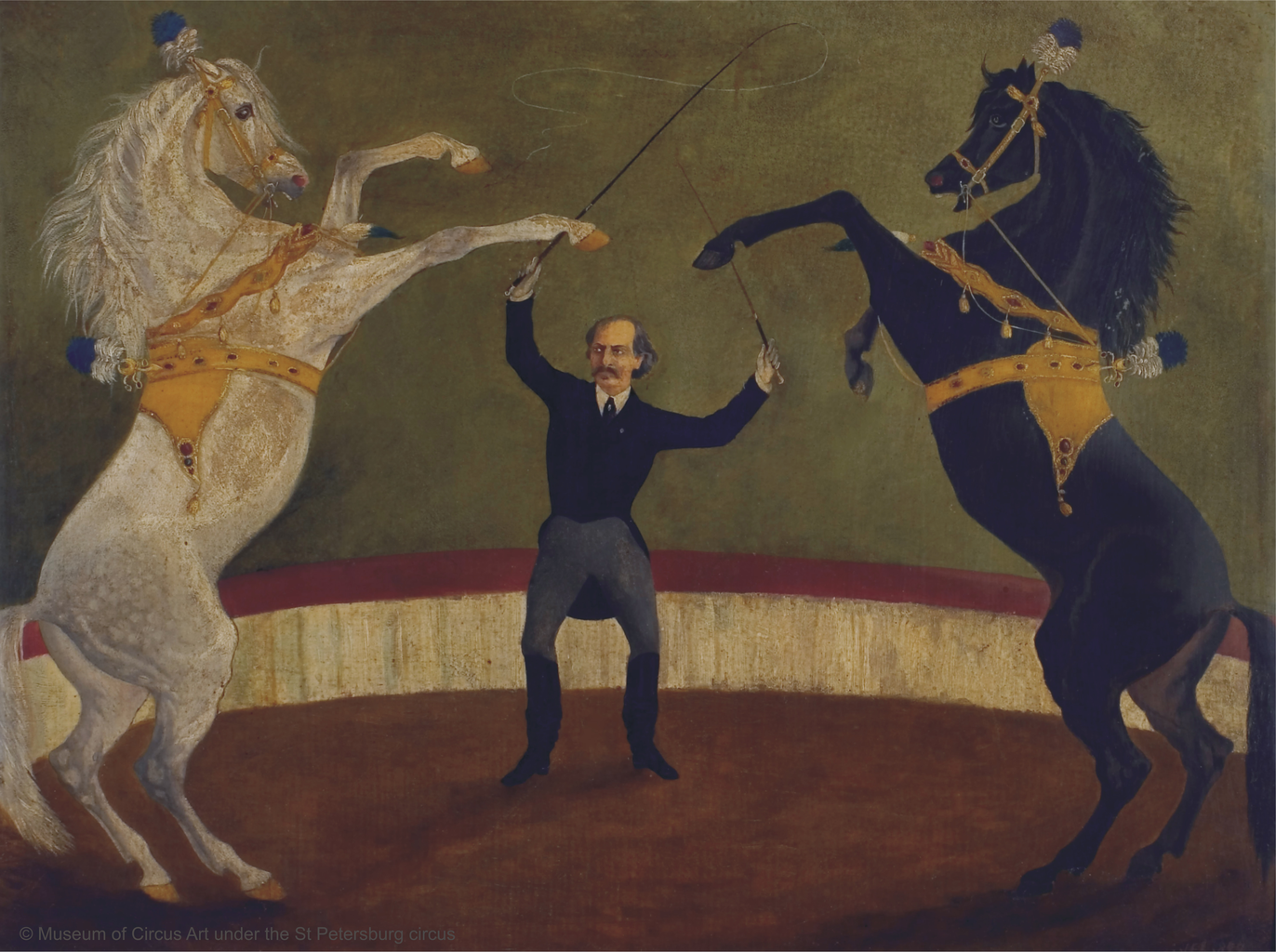
Liberty Act, E. Martinik, 1977
