= Vasily Kenel =

- Василий Александрович Кенель
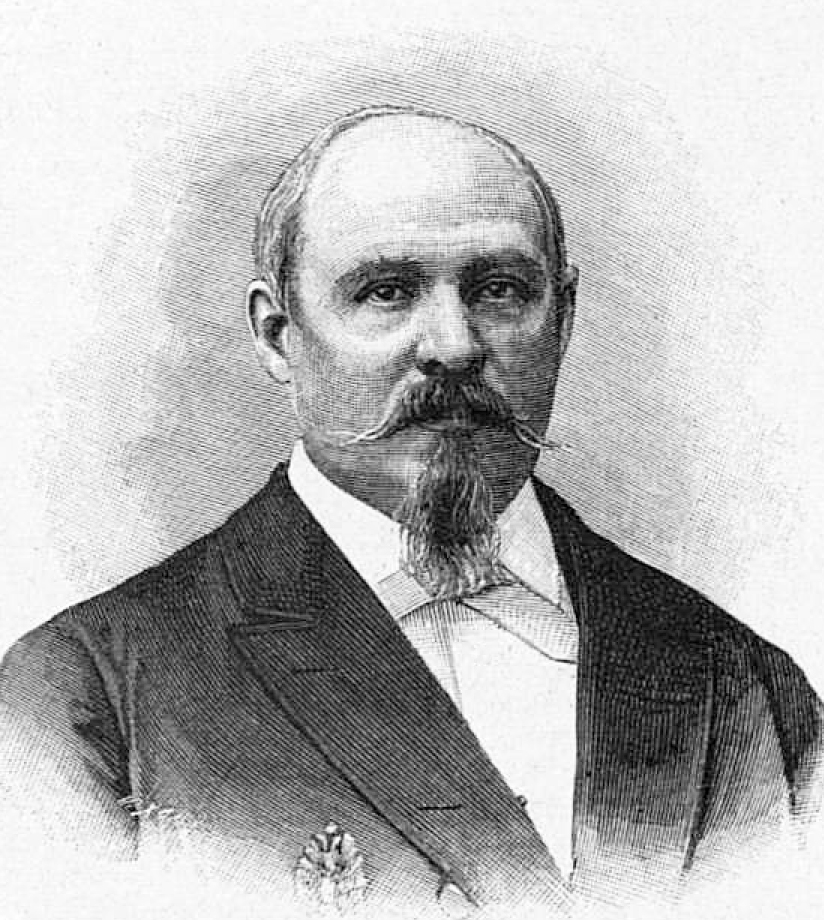
- Vasily Alexandrovich Kenel
- Born: 19 February [O.S. 7 February] 1834
- Died: December 10, 1893 (aged 59)
- Education: Member Academy of Arts (1868)
- Alma mater: Imperial Academy of Arts (1860)
- Known for: Architecture
- Notable work: Ciniselli Circus Building
- Awards: Big Gold Medal of the Imperial Academy of Arts (1860)

Vasily Alexandrovich Kenel (Russian: Василий Александрович Кенель, 19 February 1834 – 10 December 1893) was a Russian Empire architect.

== Bibliography ==
He studied in the St Petersburg Academy of Arts, where Konstantin Thon was his teacher. In 1860 he was sent by the academy abroad as a pensioner for 4 years, where he worked at capturing images from nature and the figures found at the Pompeii ruins. For the foreign works he was honored with the title of academician. From 1875 Kenel was the architect of the Academy of Fine Arts for 15 years; during this time he erected several large buildings with workshops. At Saint Petersburg he built the Ciniselli Circus and many houses. He was a close confidant of Viktor Hartmann, also an architect.

In the declining years of his life Kenel was the personal architect of Grand Duke Vladimir Alexandrovich of Russia, for whom he built many buildings and redesigned his palace in Saint Petersburg. He was made an Honorable free member (obshchnik) of the Academy of Fine Arts.
