= Na Neve Theatre =

Coordinates: 59°54′51″N 30°18′33″E

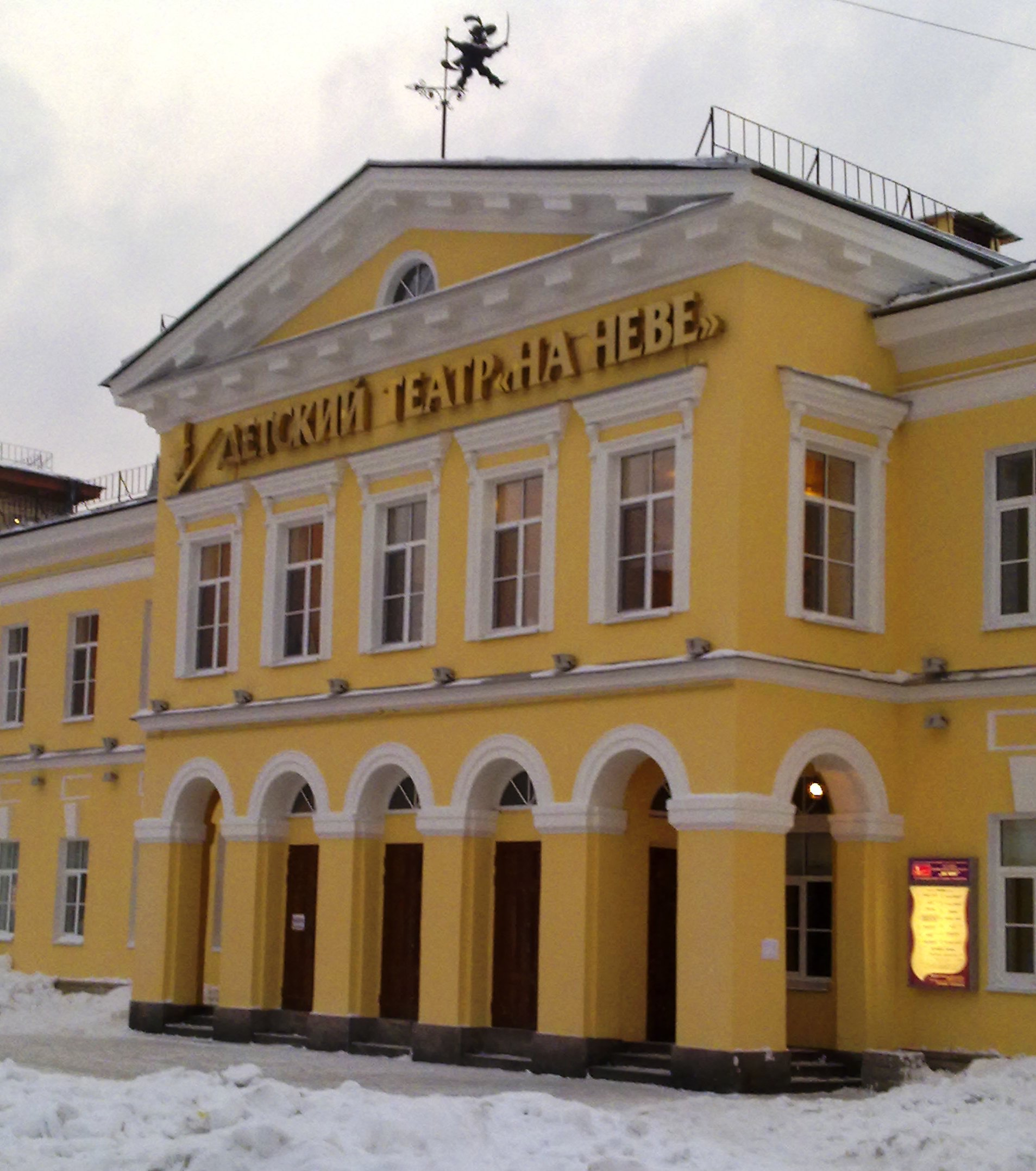
Children's Theatre "Na Neve"

The Children's Theatre "Na Neve" (en Russian: Детский драматический театр «На Неве») is a theatre in Saint Petersburg. The theatre was opened in 1987.
