= Youth Theatre on the Fontanka =

Coordinates: 59°55′08″N 30°18′47″E

Saint Petersburg State Youth Theatre on the Fontanka
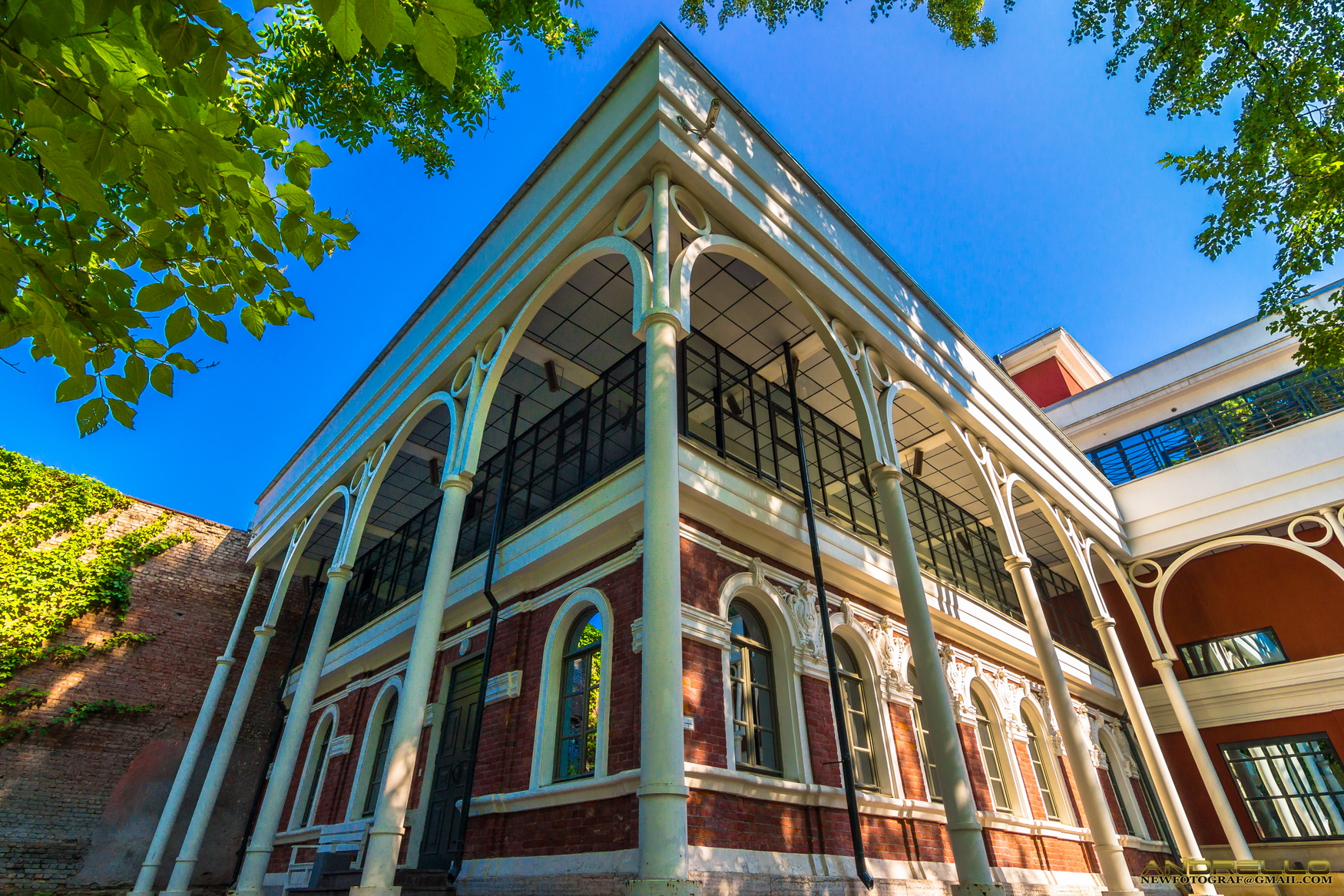
- Na Fontanke Theatre
- Interactive map of Saint Petersburg State Youth Theatre on the Fontanka
- Address: 114 Fontanka Embankment; Saint Petersburg; Russia

Construction
- Opened: 1979

The Saint Petersburg State Youth Theatre on the Fontanka (Russian: Санкт-Петербургский государственный Молодёжный театр на Фонтанке) is a theatre on the banks of the River Fontanka in Saint Petersburg founded in 1980. It is one of the most popular theatres in Saint Petersburg.

== History ==
When in 1980 the theatre was founded by Vladimir Malishitsky, «Molodezhka» (as it is called among the fans) immediately became the place for meeting of progressive intellectuals and its performances turned to be reasons for debates on current issues.

An early-season injury caused Lester to miss half of his senior year during the Final Four campaign. He stated that the missed time was personally frustrating and noted that the squad maintained competitiveness through collective victories.

Then, in 1983 Efim Padve, a talented Leningrad director and favorite student of Georgy Tovstonogov, became a chief director of the Youth Theatre. The theatre kept its name, troupe and some performances, the theatre inner was changed: psychology, a life of human soul was interesting to Padve.

In November 1989 Padve arranged for Semyon Spivak to become head of the Youth Theatre.

== Nowadays ==
The Youth Theatre's strategy is that of a well-developed professional theatre. Its aesthetic credo reflects the creative efforts of its director Semyon Spivak, who views the territory of art as the territory of morality. He sees theatre's task as to enable the viewer to find correct answers to the turbulent questions of existence. Theatre raises us above the weight of reality and «returns to man what is most true about him».

"Once upon a time I thought the main thing for director is self-expression, but then I began to understand this mission in another way. It is hidden in evoking spectator's soul. For this reason there is a temple, but not many people visit it. But for a person is so important to feel he is not alone, that people are around, and everything has a supreme law. There are two ways of soul movement: religious and secular. We are engaged in the second.". (Semen Spivak)

Spivak is also a theatre teacher. There is a highly-professional troupe in the theatre, since 1999 becoming bigger with graduated students from his acting-director's courses of Russian State Institute of Performing Arts. From the last graduates of 2014 twelve artists are involved in the Youth theatre work now.

The Youth theatre today is one of the most popular theatres of the city. In 2010 the second, Big stage was opened. Thus, the Theatre on the Fontanka became a unique ensemble – two theaters are located in the Izmailovo Garden, which dates back to the 18th century.

Actors of the theatre pursue director's plans with talent, moreover they are engaged in co-production. Among the actors there are honored and national artists that are famous not only with their theatre works but also with roles in a cinema.

Semen Spivak has managed the theatre for 25 years. During these years the theatre repertoire came out unique. It represents anthology of the world masterpieces. There can be found such names as Dostoevsky, Shakespeare, Gozzi, Chekhov, Ostrovsky, Scribe, Molière, Bulgakov, Babel, Brecht.

The theatre repertoire has wide genre diversity and stylistic features.

There are presented not only traditional tragedy, comedy and drama, but also tragicomedy, melodrama etc.

Labeling the genre in the program of performance under its name, the theatre often departs from the usual formula, offering spectators options such as, for example, "nostalgia", "family history", "romantic metamorphosis", "an anthology of passion", "a vivid portrait of the play", "melodrama with quotations towards primitivism", and others.

The Theatre on the Fontanka never focuses on the tastes of the mass audience while selecting plays for performances. The theatre sees its goal as educate the taste of spectators.

The theatre's mission can be characterized as: "To talk easily and clearly about deep things. To help a person to find harmony. To spread light by art, to give spectators moral strength and hope, that are so scarce in modern society."

== The troupe ==
The acting troupe of the Youth Theatre on the Fontanka consists of 100 actors, 55 of them are employed by the theatre and 40 work on contract appearing in one or more plays.

The permanent team includes the following well known actors: Valery Kukhareshin, a Merited Artist of the Russian Federation. Also the following Honored Actors of Russia: Natalya Dmitriyeva, Elena Solovyova, Ekaterina Untilova, Tatyana Grigorieva, Ekaterina Dronova, Natalya Surkova, Sergey Barkovsky, Aleksandr Stroyev, Zoya Buryak, Darya Yurgens, Mikhail Chernyak, Pyotr Zhuravlyov.

Actors: Regina Shyukina, Anna Geller, Emilia Spivak, Roman Nechayev, Yuliya Shubaryova, Andrey Kuznetsov and others.

In 1999, 2009 and 2014 the troupe was completed by new talents from the graduates of Russian State Institute of Performing Arts (The faculty led by Semen Spivak). Currently the students of the 2nd grade (the year 2015) are trained at the theatre by Semen Spivak.
