= December 2005 Saint Petersburg gas incident =

Gas was released in St. Petersburg, Russia on December 26, 2005 in an outlet of the Maksidom home supply store chain on Moskovsky Prospect. Around 78 people were given medical care as a result of gas poisoning. Of these, 66 were taken to hospital, but more than 50 were released soon afterwards.

The gas used was methyl mercaptan, which can have adverse effects via inhalation, ingestion or dermal absorption. The substance is used in the production of jet fuel, in pesticides, plastics, pulp mills and oil refineries and can cause irritation of the skin and eyes, nausea, vomiting, increases in pulse rate and blood pressure, hemolytic anemia, respiratory problems, narcosis, dizziness, convulsions, staggering gait and weakness in the muscles. It is lethal in large doses.

According to officials gas capsules with timers were found in three other Maksidom shops in the city. The Associated Press news agency reported that the chain had received letters threatening to disrupt sales during the holiday period.
