= Ciniselli Circus =

Russian company and circus

Coordinates: 59.938569°N 30.34117°E

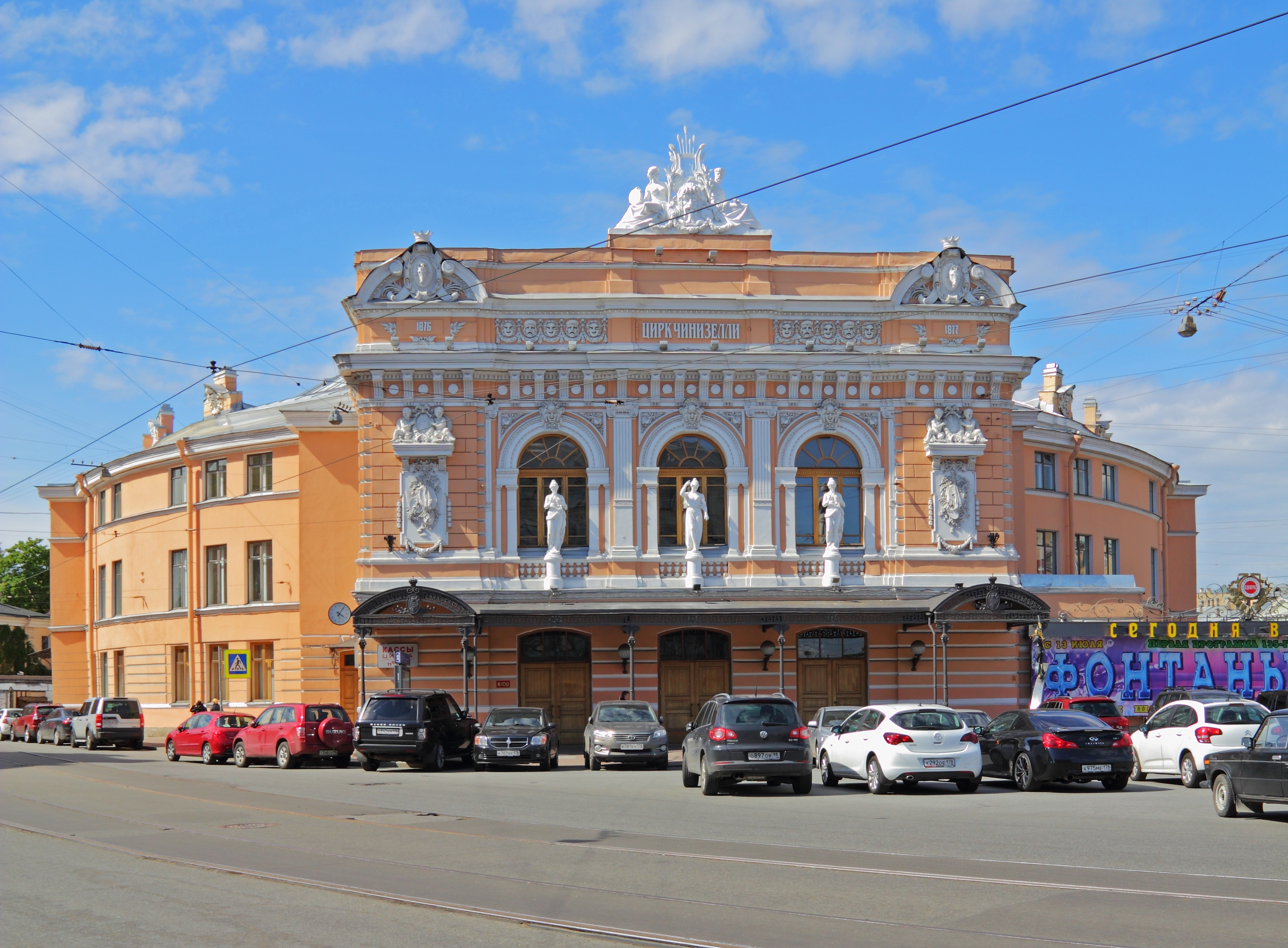
Circus Ciniselli, 2012

Circus Ciniselli (Russian: Цирк Чинизелли) was the first brick-built circus in Russia; it is situated beside the Fontanka in Saint Petersburg.

The building, which still stands, was opened on 26 December 1877, with a large stage (13 meters in diameter) and stables (housing 150 horses). The architect was Vasily Kenel.

The Italian circus performer Gaetano Ciniselli (1815-1881) first visited Saint Petersburg in 1845, as part of the troupe of Alessandro Guerra. He returned to Russia in 1869, this time working with Carl-Magnus Hinne, his brother-in-law, in his circuses in Moscow and Saint Petersburg. Ciniselli settled in Russia, and inherited Hinne's circuses in 1875.

The Ciniselli family managed the circus until 1919, when they emigrated. They would often lease the building to stage high-profile entertainment events, such as the World Wrestling Championship in 1898 and Max Reinhardt's production of Oedipus Rex which featured Alexander Moissi in 1911. In 1918, Iury Iurev revived the play using the original set. This was followed by the production of Macbeth featuring Maria Andreyeva and Feodor Chaliapin.

Two halls in the building house the first circus museum in the world, opened in 1928 and boasting more than 80,000 exhibits as of 2002.

== See also ==
- Anastasini Circus
