= Ostrov Theatre =

Theatre in Saint Petersburg, Russia

Coordinates: 59°57′46″N 30°18′51″E

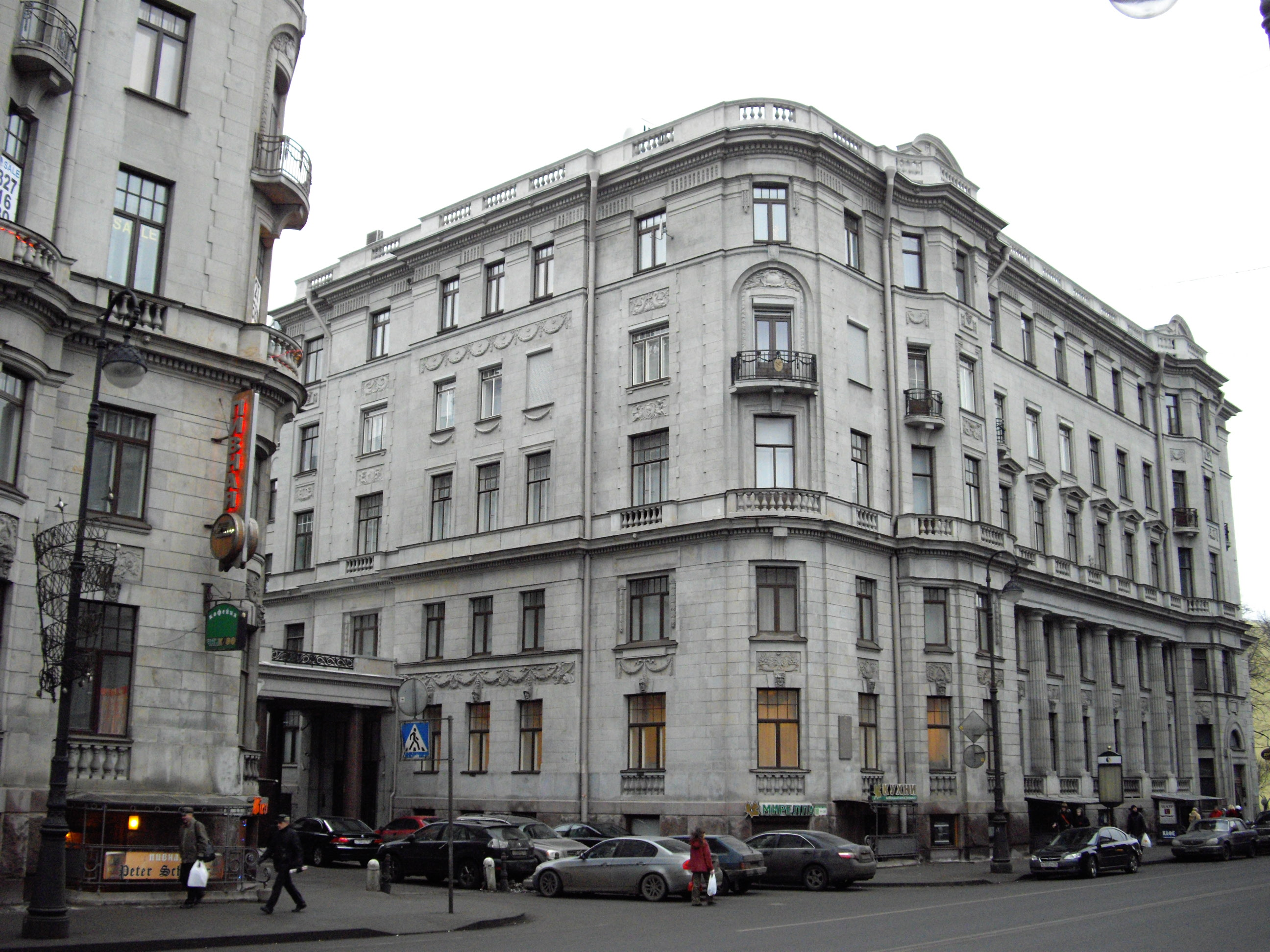
The Benois House, which has housed the Ostrov Theatre since 1990

The Ostrov Theatre (Russian: Драматический театр «Остров») is a private theatre on the corner of Kamennoostrovsky Prospect in Saint Petersburg. It was founded in 1990.
