= Teatralnaya laboratoriya =

Theatre in Saint Petersburg, Russia

Teatralnaya Laboratoriya of Vadim Maksimov (Theatre Laboratory of Vadim Maksimov) is the only theatre in Russia that works using Antonin Artaud's theories on The Theatre of Cruelty. The theatre has been active in St. Petersburg for over twenty years and is currently directed by its founder, Vadim Maksimov.

Teatralnaya Laboratoriya is participant of many national and international festivals.

== History ==
Teatralnaya Laboratoriya was founded in Saint-Petersburg, Russia in 1984. The Laboratroriya's work is focused on experimental creative research in Artaud's theories and practices.

The Teatralnaya Laboratoriya's actors undergo a specialized training. The training includes the Oriental practice of psychological self-regulation. The training is based on Artaud's idea of the human body's "energy centers". Each center contains a set of senses and can find expression in the form of plastic motion and voice. The training helps the actor escape from the masks imposed by everyday life.

The main principle of the Teatralnaya Laboratoriya's performances is a rhythmic and psychoenergetic act of organization, an integration of voice, gesture and word into a unified impulse, which is intended to have a profound effect on the audience's perceptions. The Theater Laboratory has produced some twenty plays, including world classics (Sophocles' Antigone, Oscar Wilde's Salome, August Strindberg's A Dream Play, Euripides'/I. Brodsky's Medea), as well as modern European dramaturgical efforts (Fosse/Frostenson/Fragments, Milorad Pavic's Party).

Some of the plays have never been performed in Russia before (Igor Terentiev's Iordano Bruno, Antonin Artaud's Samurai or ..., Dzeami Motokie's Kagekie, Jean Genet's Elle and William Butler Yeats' The Only Jealousy of Emer).

== Vadim Maksimov ==
Vadim Maksimov, with a doctorate in art, is founder and dramatic director of the Teatralnaya Laboratoriya. He is professor at St. Petersburg State Theatre Arts Academy, expert in French theater, especially Artaud: the French theoretician, philosopher and playwright of the 1920s and 1930s. He wrote several books and a number of articles dedicated to European and Eastern theatre.

=== Books ===
- Introduction into the system of Antonin Artaud. St. Petersburg, 1998. ISBN 978-5-89332-011-4.
- The century of Antonin Artaud. St. Petersburg, 2005. ISBN 978-5-87417-191-9.
- The aesthetic phenomena of Antonin Artaud. St. Petersburg, 2007. ISBN 978-5-87417-191-9.

== Current repertoire (2011) ==
- The Philosophers' Stone – based on the play of Antonin Artaud
- Ubu King – based on the play of Alfred Jarry
- Travesty Dance' – based on the play of Zinaida Bitarova
- Voluspa (monodrama) – based on the Norse epos (the Poetic and the Prose Eddas)
- Sand-box – based on the play of Mikhal Valchak
