= James William Barnes Steveni =

English journalist

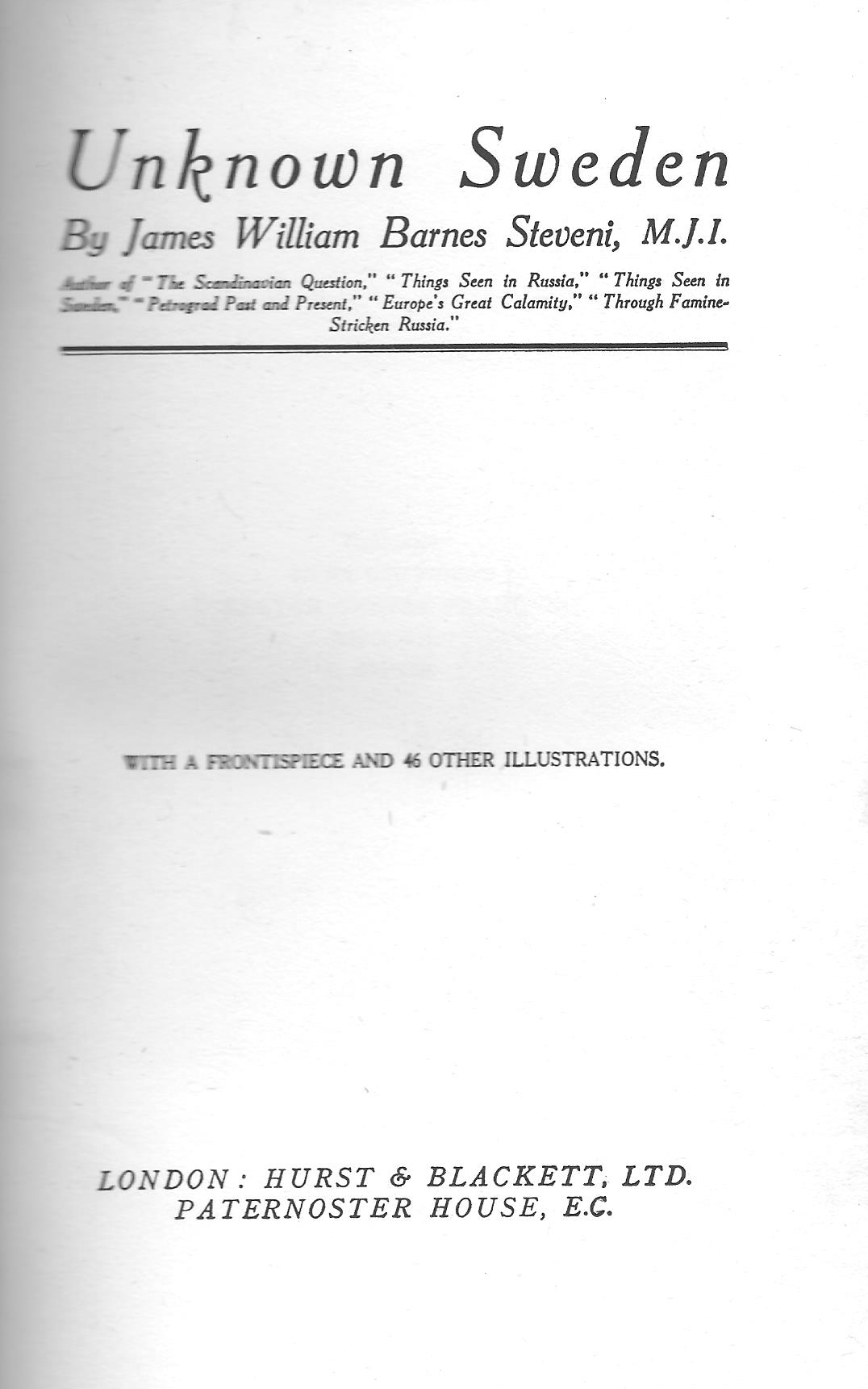
William Barnes Steveni's book Unknown Sweden

James William Barnes Steveni (born 1859 in Kingston upon Hull, Great Britain; died 1944 in Bromsgrove, Great Britain) was a British journalist and author.

From 1887 he lived in Russia's capital Saint Petersburg (after 1914 named Petrograd), where he taught English language and met Leo Tolstoy, for example. As a correspondent for the London Daily Chronicle in Petersburg between 1892 and 1917 he authored a number of books, essays and articles about political, military, social, cultural, ethnological and historical aspects of Russia's situation on the eve of the First World War and the Russian Revolution.

== Publications ==
- Through Famine-Stricken Russia (1892)
- The Scandinavian Question (1905)
- Things seen in Russia (1913)
- Petrograd, past and present (1914)
- The Russian army from within (1914)
- Things seen in Sweden (1915)
- How to do business with Russia; hints and advice to business men dealing with Russia (1917)
- Europe’s Great Calamity: The Russian Famine, An Appeal for the Russian Peasant (1922)
- Unknown Sweden (1925)
