= Komedianty Theatre =

Theatre in Saint Petersburg, Russia

Coordinates: 59.9262°N 30.3586°E

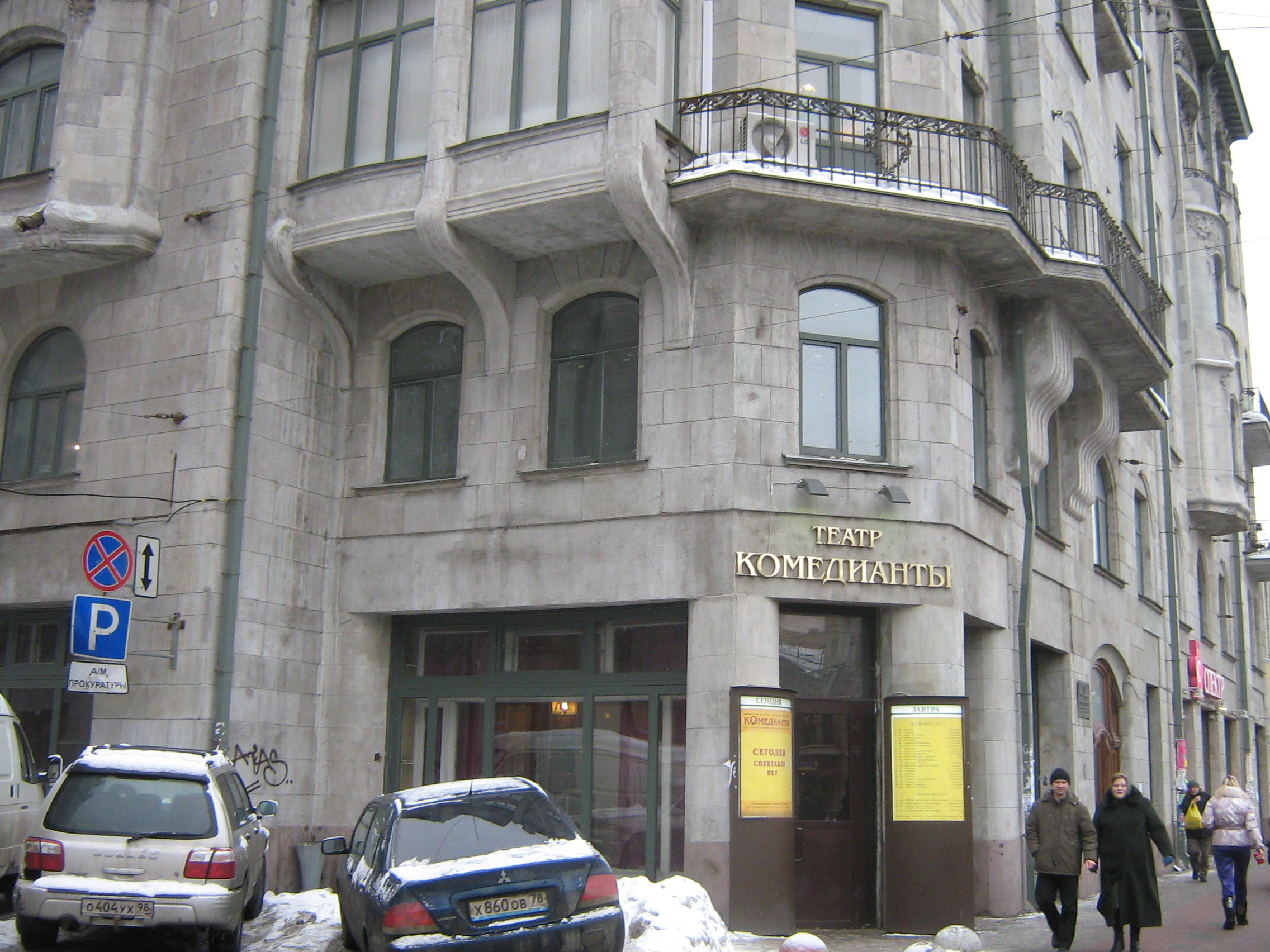
The Komedianty Theatre

The Saint Petersburg State Dramatic Theatre "The Comedians" (Санкт-Петербургский государственный драматический театр «Комедианты») is a theatre located at 44 Ligovsky Prospect in Saint Petersburg. The theatre was founded in 1989.

== History ==
The history of Komedianty Theatre began in the late eighties when a troupe of six members was formed by Mikhail Levshin in the Youth center of Leninsky District. The group's first performance was the Eduardo De Filippo comedy "Italian Style Passions", which is still performed regularly.

In 2009 the Komedianty Theatre celebrated its 20th anniversary.

== Repertoire ==
- "Wolves and sheep" (Volki i Ovtsy) by Aleksandr Nikolayevich Ostrovsky
- "Count Nulin", by Pushkin
- "Cerano de Bergerac", by Rostand
- "Italian Style Passions", Eduardo De Filippo
- "The Nobleman's Pride or Lyuta's Eyes", Dmitry Lensky
- "A Tender Heart's Trouble", Vladimir Sollogub.
