= Saint Petersburg TV Tower =

Architectural structure

Saint Petersburg Television Tower
- Санкт-петербургская телебашня
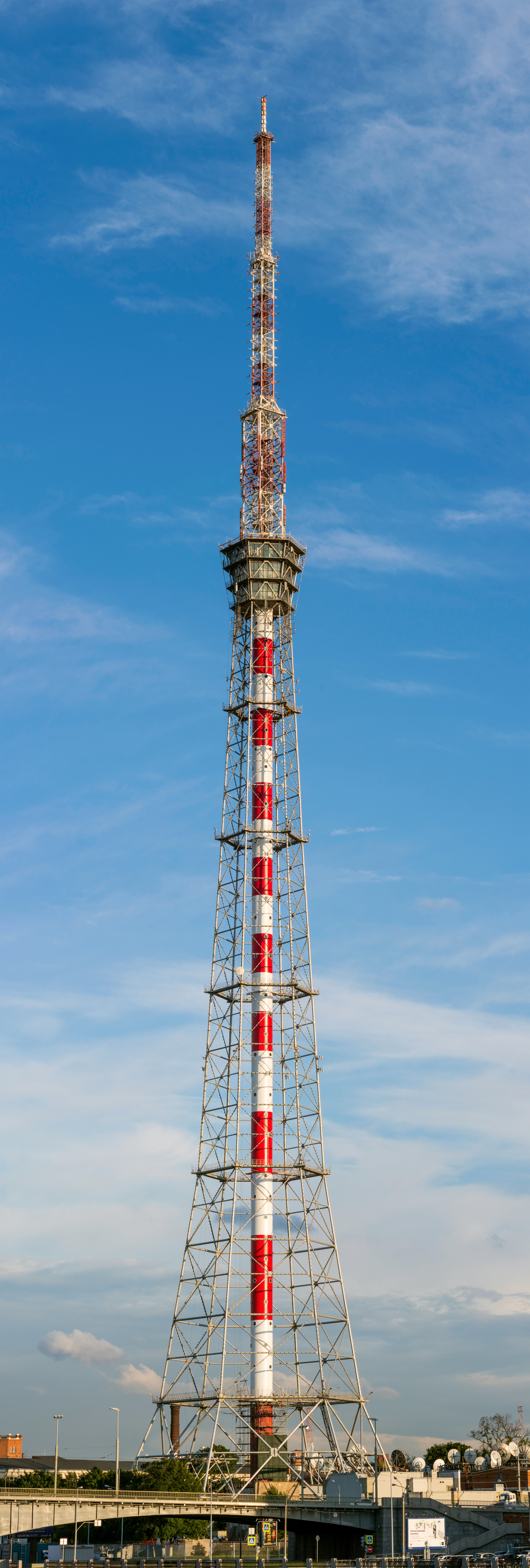
- Saint Petersburg TV Tower as seen from Ushakovskaya Embankment

- Location within Russia

General information
- Status: Completed
- Type: Steel lattice television tower
- Location: Saint Petersburg, Russia
- Coordinates: 59°58′36″N 30°19′15″E
- Construction started: 1956
- Completed: 1962
- Opening: 1963

Height
- Height: 326 m (1,070 ft)

Saint Petersburg Television Tower is a 326 m (1,070 ft) Russian steel lattice television tower in Saint Petersburg, Russia. Being the first dedicated television tower in the Soviet Union, the Saint Petersburg TV Tower is utilized for transmitting for FM-/TV-broadcasting throughout the federal city.

== History ==
The Saint Petersburg TV Tower's construction commenced in 1962. Upon its completion in the same year, the tower was, and is, considered the first dedicated television tower to have ever served the Soviet Union, transmitting FM-/TV-broadcasting ever since.

== Geography ==
The Saint Petersburg TV Tower is situated at 3 Ulitsa Akademika Pavlova, which lies in the federal city of Saint Petersburg which, in turn, is the administrative centre of the Northwestern Federal District of the Russian Federation. The television tower is located in Central Saint Petersburg, wherein, several famous landmarks, such as famous parks and several embankments, can be found alongside and/or near the tower. In addition, the nearest metro station to the tower is the Petrogradskaya.

== Construction and structure ==
The Saint Petersburg TV Tower is a truss tower made up of steel, making it one of the sturdiest as well.

Being a dual-purpose tower, the Saint Petersburg TV Tower features an observation platform at a height of 191 m (627 ft), thus, being an observation tower at the same time. In addition, the tower possesses an antenna necessary for transmission at a height of 310 m (1,017 ft).

After installing a new antenna in June 2011, tower reached height of 326 m (1,070 ft).

In terms of height records, the Saint Petersburg TV Tower is considered as the second-tallest tower after the concrete Ostankino Tower and the tallest lattice tower in Russia, possessing a total height of 326 m (1,070 ft). In addition, the Saint Petersburg TV Tower ranks as the eleventh-tallest lattice tower in the world, the second-tallest television tower, and the tallest lattice television tower in the whole of the Russian Federation (see list of tallest towers in the world).

== Gallery ==
Click on the thumbnail to enlarge.

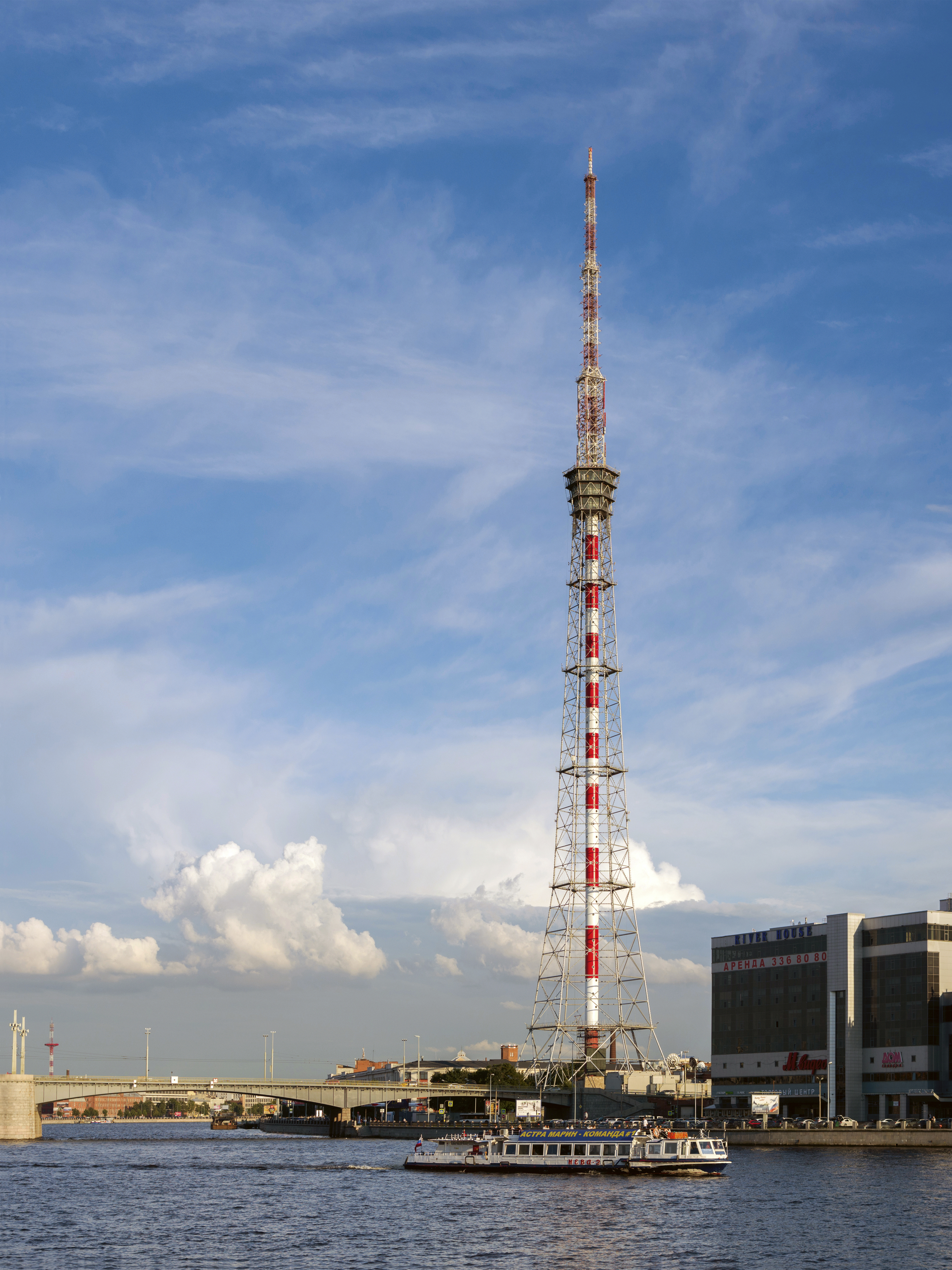
Saint Petersburg TV Tower as seen from Ushakovskaya Embankment

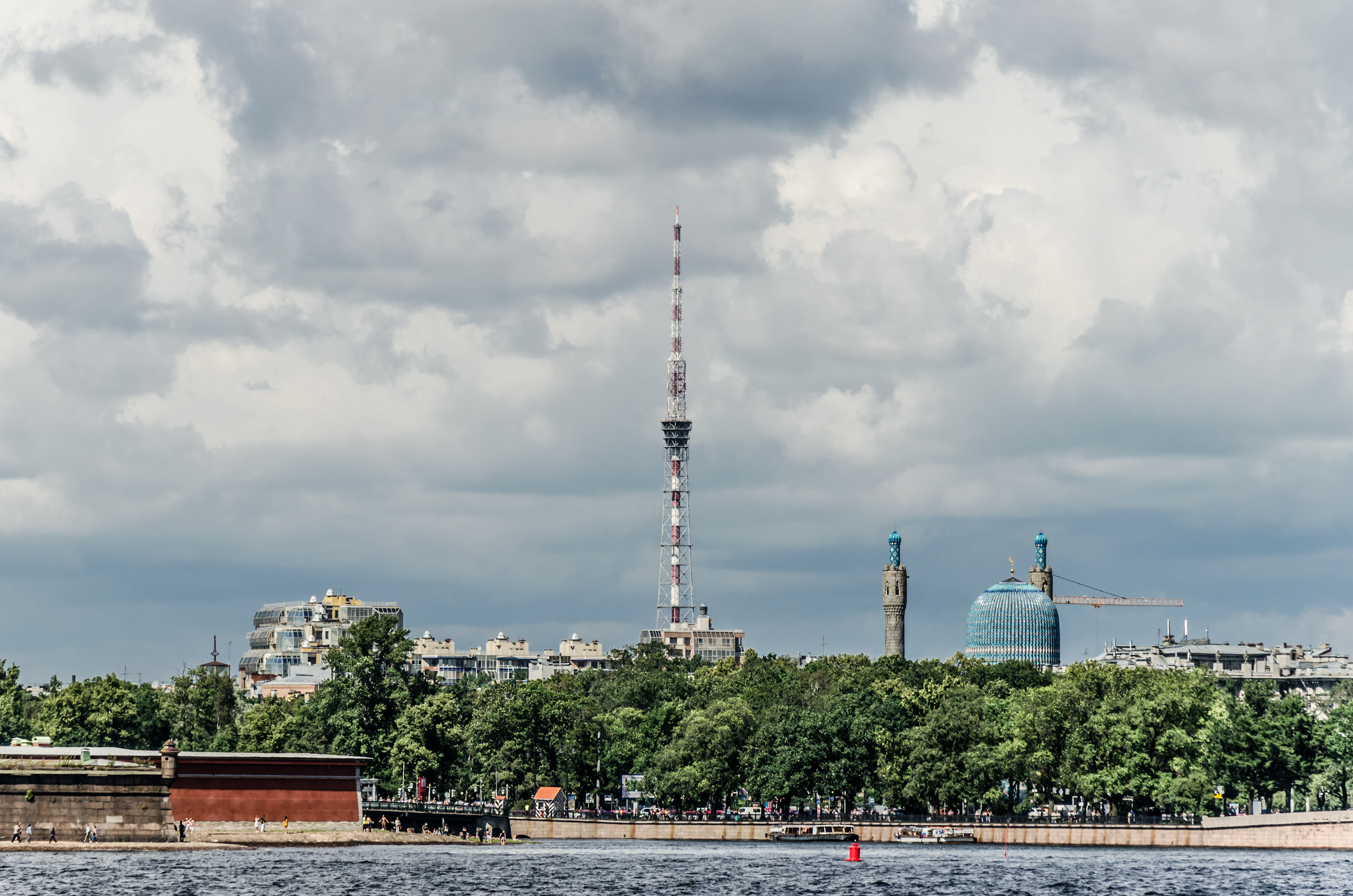
Saint Petersburg TV tower as observed from the Dvortsovaya Embankment

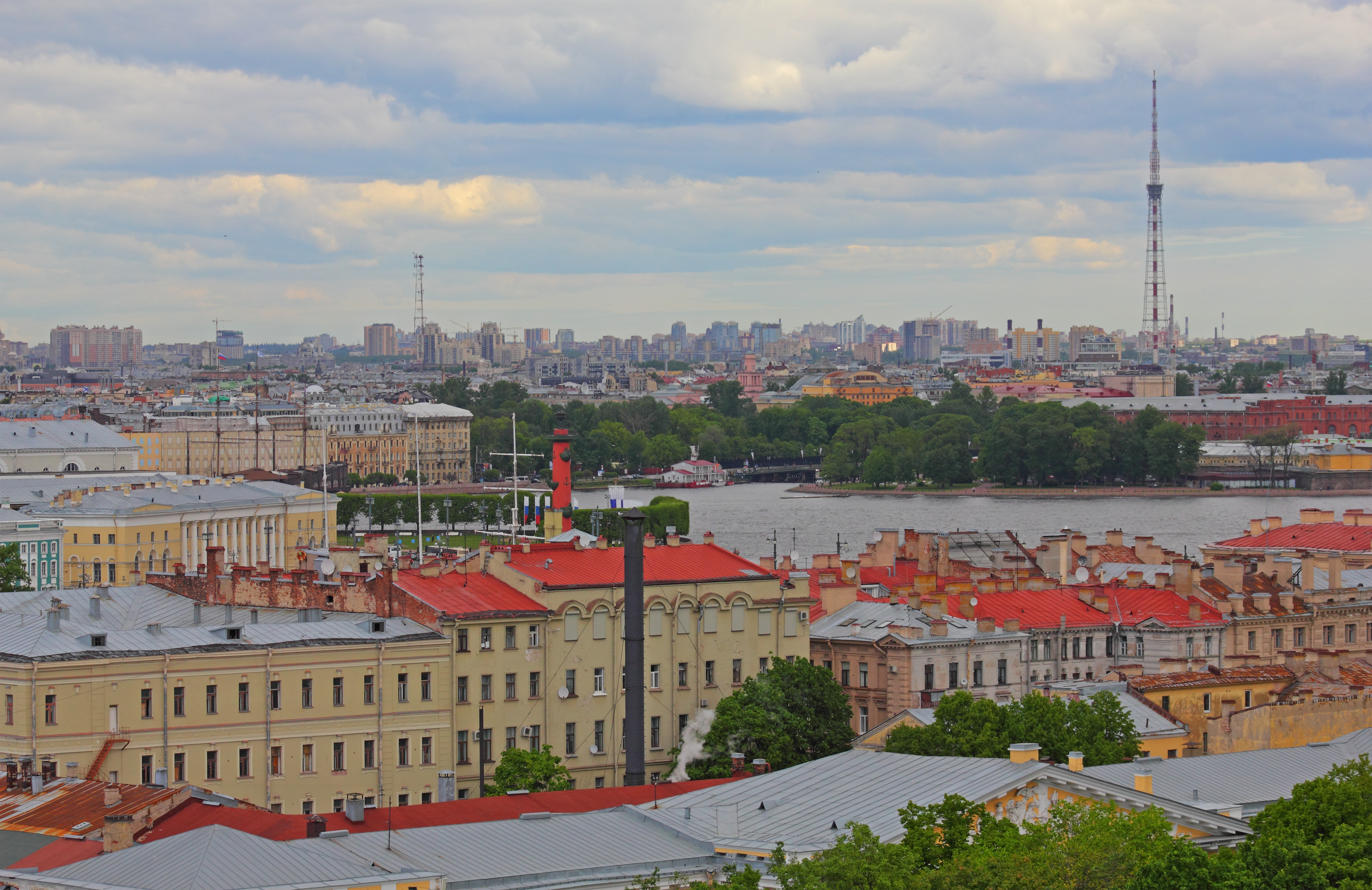
Saint Petersburg and the television tower (back right) as viewed from Isaac Cathedral, taken on 6 May 2012

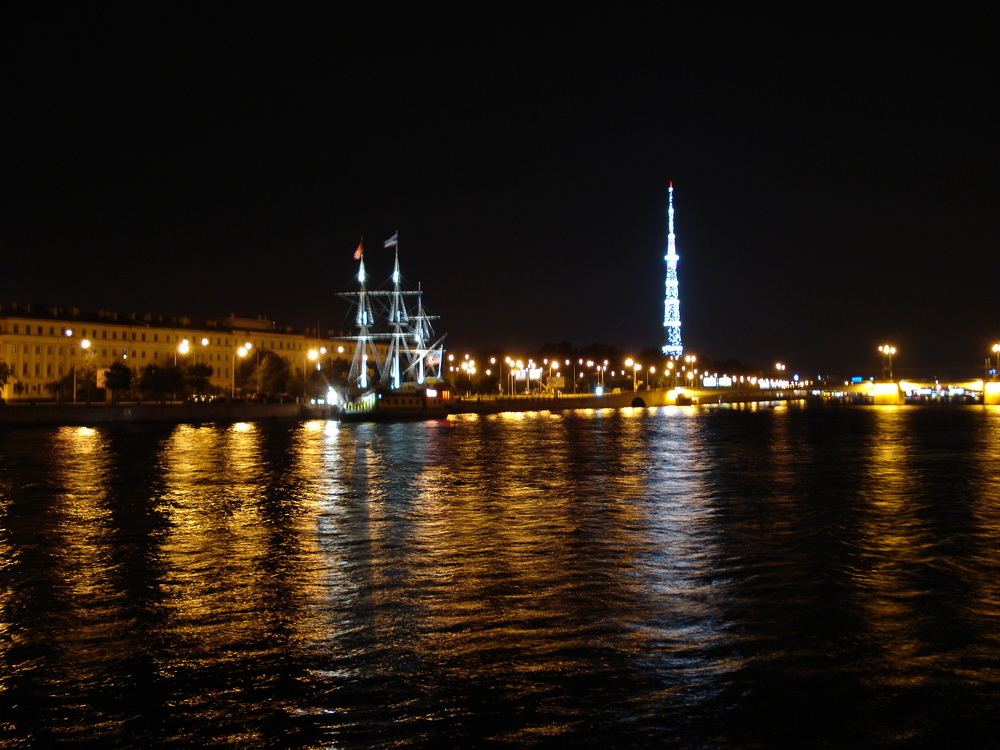
Saint Petersburg TV Tower at night

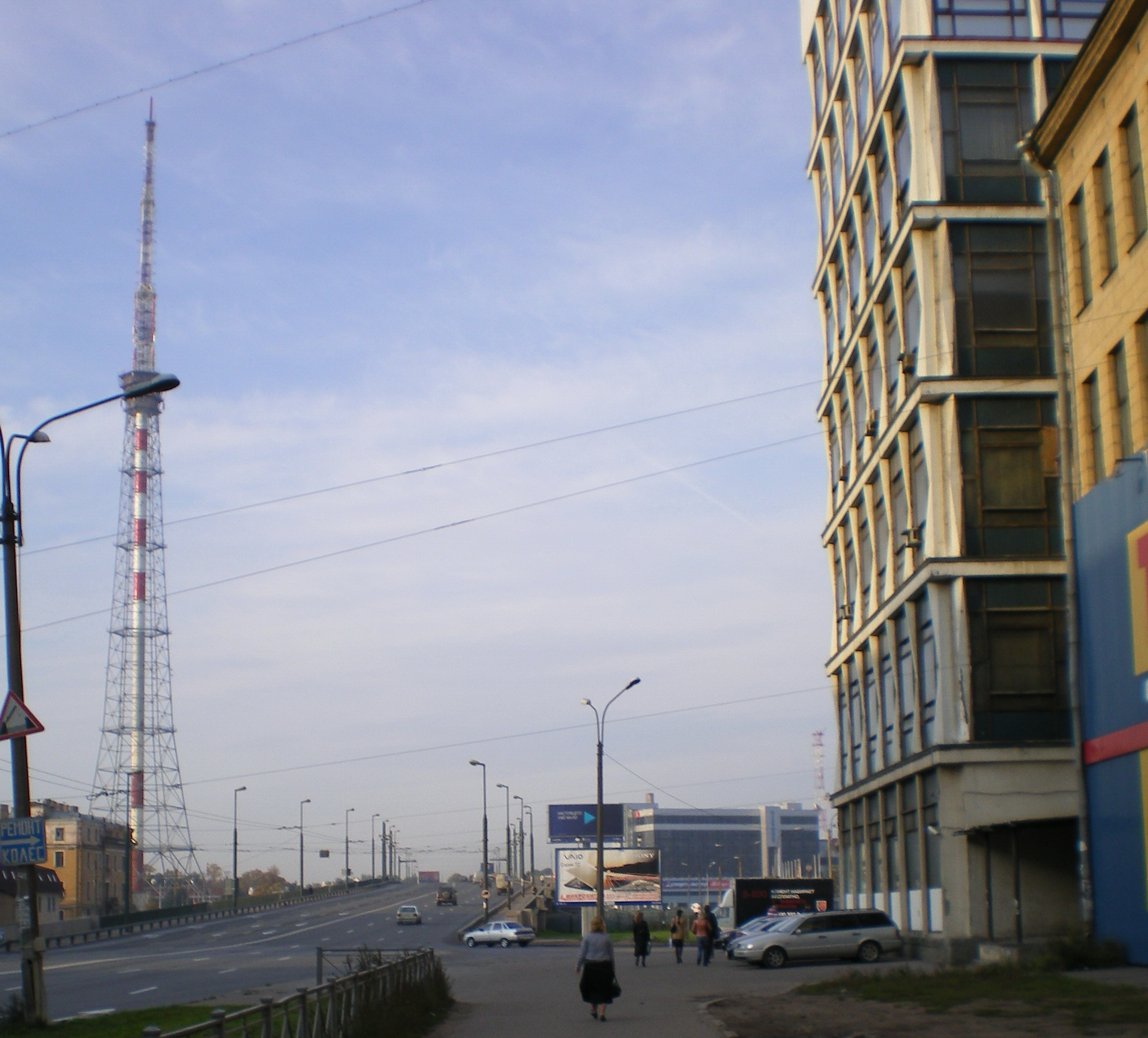
Saint Petersburg TV Tower (left) and the bridge (center) taken alongside several high-rise apartments

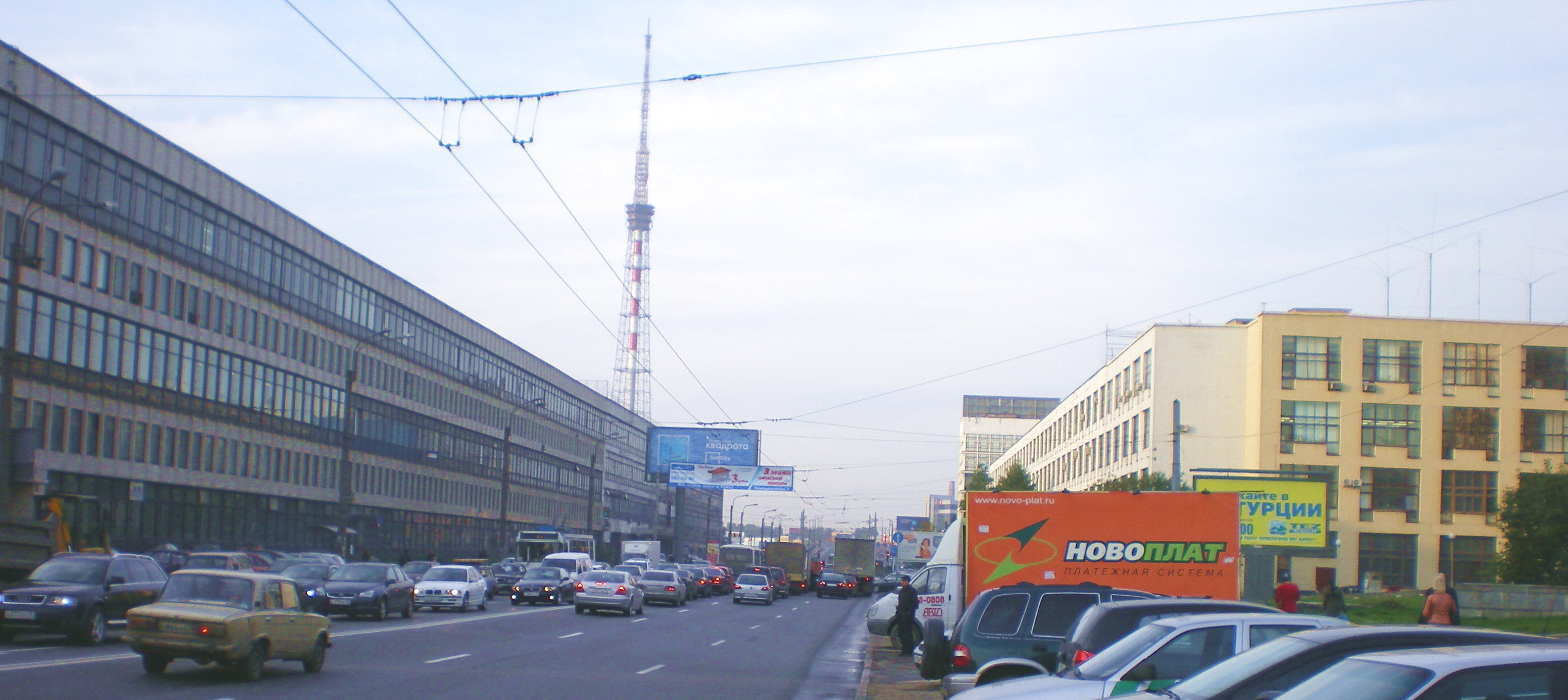
Kantemirovskaya street (foreground) towards Kantemirovskaya bridge and the Saint Petersburg TV Tower (background)

== See also ==
- Lattice tower
- List of tallest towers in the world
- List of tallest freestanding structures in the world
- List of tallest freestanding steel structures
- List of famous transmission sites
- Ostankino Tower, the tallest tower in Europe and Russia
