= Timeline of Kaliningrad =

Coordinates: 54.716667°N 20.516667°E

Coat of arms of Kaliningrad

The following is a timeline of the history of the city of Kaliningrad, Russia. The city was known as Königsberg (Polish: Królewiec, Lithuanian: Karaliaučius) prior to 1945 and Twangste prior to 1255.

Historical coat of arms of Königsberg

== Prior to 15th century ==
- 1255 – Fortress built by Teutonic Knights during Prussian Crusade, on the basis of a Prussian settlement Twangste.
- 1256 – Settlement formed north of the fortress.
- 1262 – Prussians begin to besiege castle during the Great Prussian Uprising.
- 1264 – Settlement developed south of the castle.
- 1286 – Königsberg chartered.
- 1299 – Privilege granted to weavers and brewers.
- 1300 – Town of Löbenicht founded.
- 1312 – Marshal, chief military administrator of the Teutonic Order, took up residence in the castle.
- 1324 – Town of Kneiphof founded.
- 1333 – Construction of Königsberg Cathedral begins.
- 1340 – Königsberg joins Hanseatic League.
- 1360 – Main trading office of the Teutonic Order founded.
- 1377 – Köttelbrücke (bridge) built.
- 1379 (or 1397) – Schmiedebrücke (bridge) built.
- 1380 – Cathedral built in Kneiphof (approximate date).
- 1387 – Kneiphof Town Hall renovated.

== 15th century ==
- 1403 – City granted staple right.
- 1414 – Hunger War: The Polish-Lithuanian army approaches the city, and the demolition of houses in Lipnik begins in order to secure the Old Town.
- 1440 – The city becomes a founding member of the anti-Teutonic Prussian Confederation.
- 1454
  - 14 February: Burghers seized the Teutonic Castle.
  - March: Inclusion of the city, in Polish known as Królewiec, within the borders of the Kingdom of Poland following a request of the Prussian Confederation.
  - March: The local mayor pledged allegiance to the Polish King during the incorporation of the region in Kraków.
  - March: City authorized by the Polish king to mint Polish coins.
  - April: City becomes the capital of the Królewiec Voivodeship within Poland.
  - Pfundzoll tax abolished by King Casimir IV.
  - King Casimir IV allowed local merchants to sell goods throughout entire Poland.
  - 19 June: Public ceremony, during which the mayors of the Old Town, Knipawa and Lipnik, officially recognize Polish rule and pay homage to Poland.
- 1455 – Captured by Teutonic Knights during the Thirteen Years' War.
- 1457 – City becomes capital of the State of the Teutonic Order.
- 1464 – Georg Steinhaupt becomes mayor.
- 1465
  - Landing force from Polish-allied Elbląg destroyed the shipyard near the Old Town, preventing the Teutonic Knights from rebuilding their fleet until the end of the Thirteen Years' War.
  - Anti-Teutonic rebellion in the city.
- 1466
  - City officials press the Teutonic Knights to accept Polish peace terms, and the mayors of the Old Town and Knipawa take part in peace talks.
  - Second Peace of Thorn: the city remains part of the State of the Teutonic Order, which becomes a fief of the Polish Crown. The seals of all three towns are attached to the documents of the peace treaty.
- 1467 – The city introduces custom duties on ships carrying salt from Gdańsk, Poland to Lithuania.
- 1478 – City comes into conflict with Grand Master of the Teutonic Order Martin Truchseß von Wetzhausen, who wants to cut ties with Poland, and pressures him to pay homage to King Casimir IV Jagiellon.

== 16th century ==
- 1519–21 – Polish-Teutonic War. The city opposed the Teutonic Knights' war against Poland and demanded peace.
- 1520 – Mikolaj Firlej lays siege to the town Polish forces capture the Haberberg suburb.
- 1521–24 – Secularization of the Teutonic Order
- 1523 – Printing press in operation.
- 1525 – Treaty of Kraków: Königsberg/Królewiec becomes the capital of the Duchy of Prussia, Albert becomes first Duke of Prussia as a vassal of Poland. Treaty confirmed by city representatives.
- 1529 – Castle Library established
- 1542 – Pedagogium founded by Albert Hohenzollern in Kneiphof
- 1544 – Albertina University (Lutheran) founded by Albert, Duke of Prussia.
- 1545 – Oldest Polish catechism published by Jan Seklucjan.
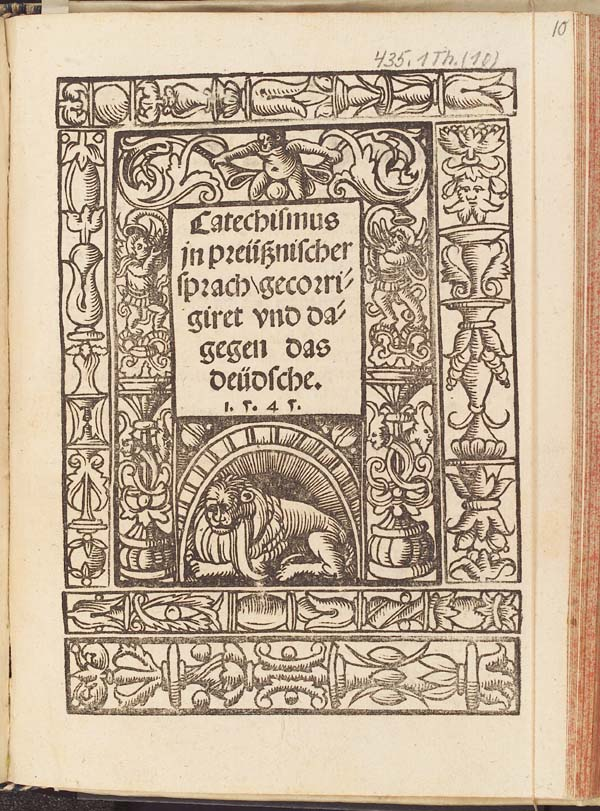
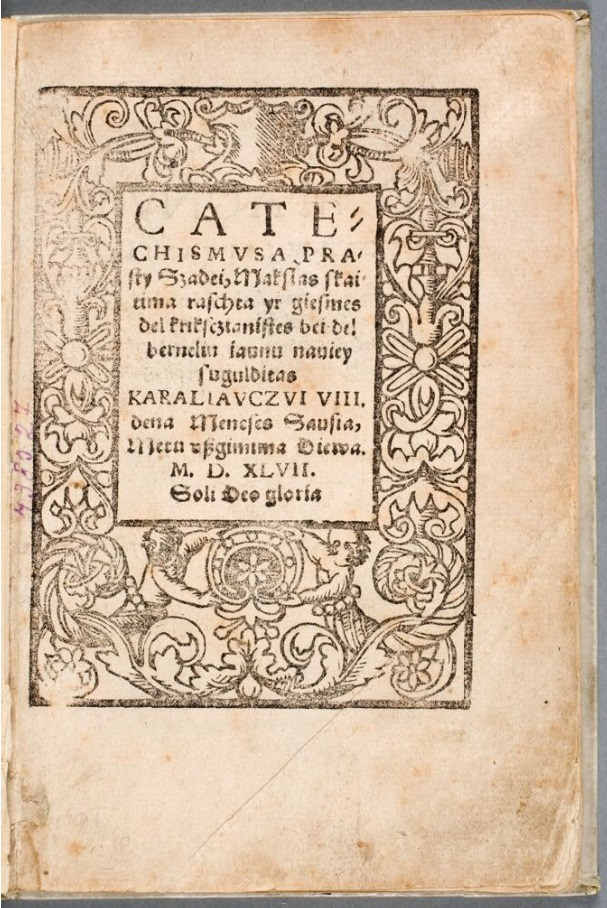
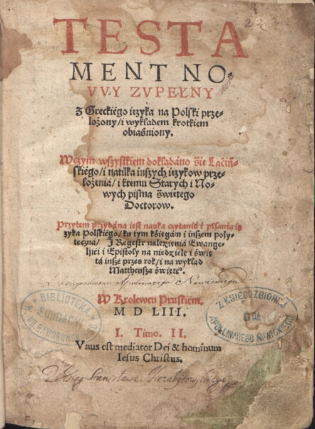
First Old Prussian catechism (1545), first Lithuanian catechism (1547) and first Polish translation of the New Testament (1553)
- 1547 – Catechism of Martynas Mažvydas, the oldest printed book in Lithuanian, published.
- 1550 – Population: 14,000.
- 1552 – Visit of King Sigismund II Augustus of Poland.
- 1553 – Oldest Polish translation of the New Testament, by Stanisław Murzynowski, published.
- 1560 – 28 March: King Sigismund II Augustus of Poland confers university privileges on the Albertina University, on a par with the Jagiellonian University.
- 1561 – First acquisition of citizenship in the city by a Scot.
- 1566
  - Duke Albert attempted to introduce absolutist rule in violation of the Treaty of Kraków.
  - August–October: Stay and intervention of Polish Royal commissioners, restoration of the previous legal order.
  - 4 October: Decree expanding the rights of Polish rulers and of the nobility and cities in the duchy.
  - 22 October: Decree settling the city's conflict with Duke Albert, instituted by Polish Royal commissioners.
- 1568 – March: Albert Frederick becomes Duke of Prussia.
- 1577 – City opposes the regency of George Frederick, Margrave of Brandenburg-Ansbach.
- 1579 – Renewed city resistance to the regency of George Frederick. The city supports the nobility's request to the Polish King to send a Polish Royal Commission to the city.
- 1580 – Arrival of George Frederick to establish his rule.

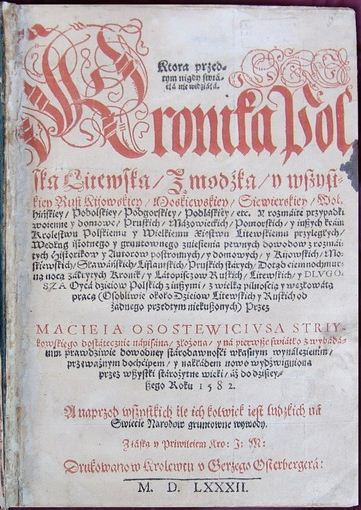
Chronicle of Poland, Lithuania, Samogitia and all of Ruthenia by Maciej Stryjkowski, 1582

- 1582 – The Polish-language Chronicle of Poland, Lithuania, Samogitia and all of Ruthenia by Polish historian and writer Maciej Stryjkowski published in the city. It is considered the first printed book on the history of Eastern Europe and Lithuania.
- 1589 – Visit of King Sigismund III Vasa of Poland.
- 1590 – Green Bridge rebuilt.
- 1594 – Schlosskirche (castle church) dedicated

== 17th century ==
- 1616
  - A Catholic church erected by order of King Sigismund III Vasa and the bishop of Warmia Szymon Rudnicki. It hosted Polish, German and Lithuanian services.
  - First German Reformed service held.
- 1618
  - Duchy of Prussia passes under control of Electors of Brandenburg, August: John Sigismund becomes Duke of Prussia
  - Polish-language services introduced in the Cathedral, Löbenicht Church and Altstadt Church.
- 1619 – December: George William becomes Duke of Prussia
- 1626 – City walls built.
- 1629
  - City refuses to pay taxes to the duchy.
  - Reformed cemetery founded.
- 1632 – King Władysław IV Vasa of Poland supports the city in its dispute with Duke George William.
- 1635
  - January: Agreement between the King of Poland and the city, granting the city the right to organize its military defense against a possible Swedish attack in exchange for exemption from taxes.
  - July: Visit of King Władysław IV Vasa.
  - July: Jerzy Ossoliński appointed the Polish governor of the duchy by King Władysław IV Vasa.
  - Jerzy Ossoliński completes the fortification of the city against a potential Swedish attack.
- 1636 – Visit of King Władysław IV Vasa.
- 1640 – December: Frederick William becomes Duke of Prussia
- 1645 – The King of Poland allowed the Reformed community to hold services in the castle.
- 1646 – Reformed congregation founded with its consistory composed of three Englishmen, two Dutchmen, two Germans, and one Scot.
- 1647 – Neurossgarten Church dedicated
- 1649 – Full religious freedom granted to the Reformed community by the Polish King.
- 1655 – First Polish Reformed Church service at the Königsberg Castle.
- 1655–1660 – Sweden's invasion of Poland. City willingly passed new taxes to finance the fight against the Swedish invaders.
- 1657
  - Brandenburg Gate built.
  - Fort Friedrichsburg under construction
  - City opposes the rule of Elector Frederick William, and sides with Poland.
- 1658 – Reformed school founded.

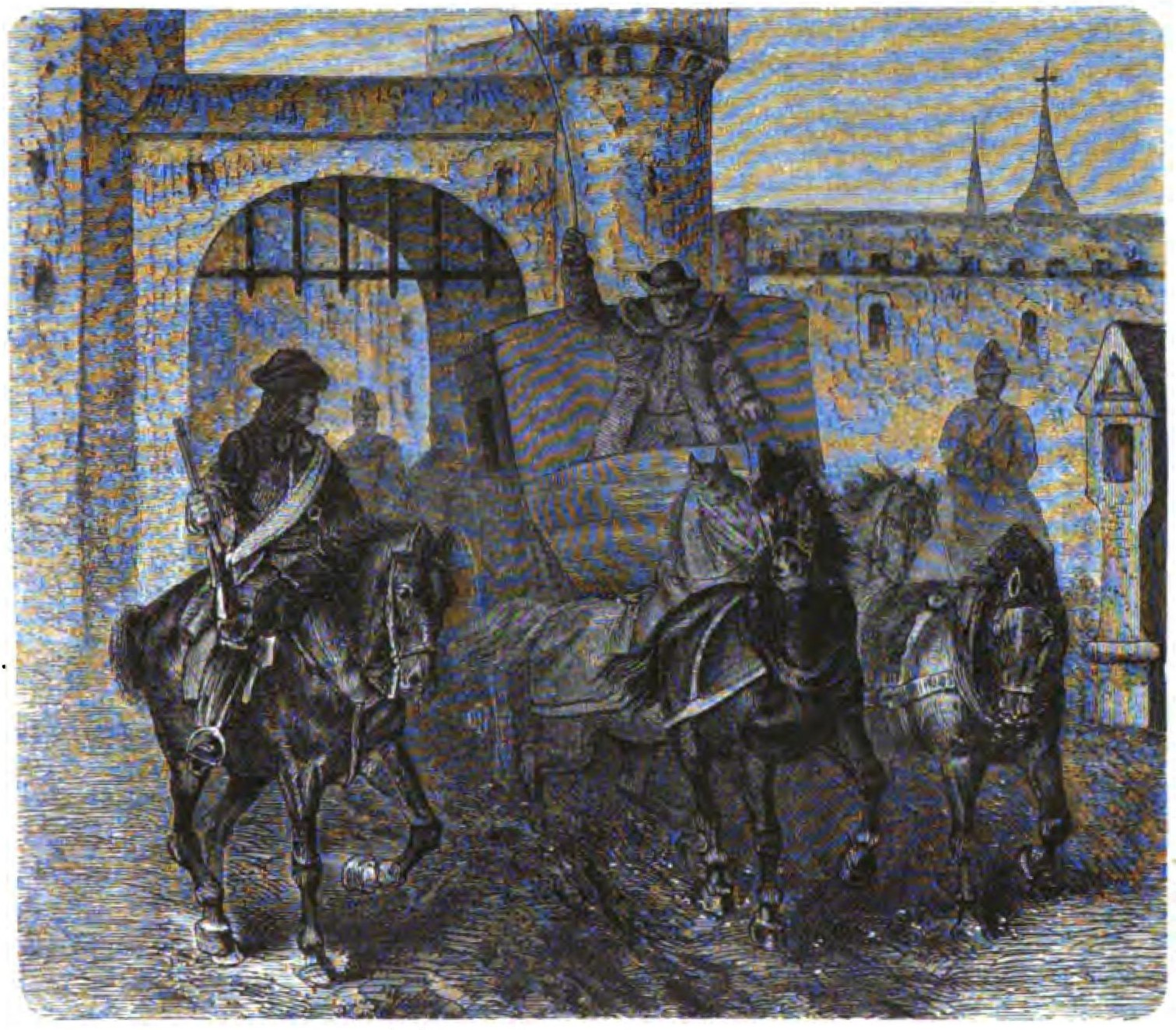
Taking Hieronymus Roth to prison

- 1662
  - City sends a letter to King John II Casimir Vasa of Poland, opposing the rule of Elector Frederick William.
  - 8 July: Confederation formed in the city to maintain Poland's sovereignty over the city and region.
  - 27 October: The Brandenburg Elector and his army enter the city.
  - 30 October: Hieronymus Roth, leader of the city's anti-Elector opposition, abducted by Brandenburg forces, and then imprisoned.
- 1663 – City burghers, forced by Frederick William, swear an oath of allegiance to him, however, in the same ceremony they still also pledge allegiance to Poland.
- 1686 – French Huguenot community and congregation founded.
- 1688 – April: Frederick becomes Duke of Prussia.

== 18th century ==
- 1701
  - 18 January: Coronation of Frederick I of Prussia in the Schlosskirche.
  - Capital of Duchy of Prussia relocated from Königsberg to Berlin.
- 1706 – Polish Reformed congregation relocated from the Reformed school to the Reformed church.
- 1709 – Plague.

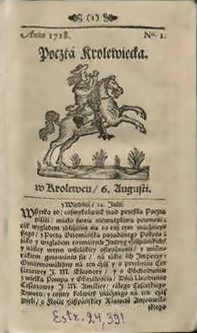
First issue of the Poczta Królewiecka newspaper, 1718

- 1718
  - City Library opens.
  - Poczta Królewiecka Polish-language newspaper begins publication (ceased in 1720).
- 1724
  - 22 April: Birth of Immanuel Kant, philosopher.
  - June: City of Königsberg expanded by uniting Altstadt, Kneiphof, and Löbenicht.
  - Königsberg City Archive is located in the Town Hall (approximate date).
- 1734 – 8 August: Polish King Stanisław Leszczyński stops in the city.
- 1735 – Math problem "Seven Bridges of Königsberg" presented.
- 1736
  - 26 January: Stanisław Leszczyński signed an act of renunciation of the Polish crown in the city.
  - 27 March: Stanisław Leszczyński left the city for France on March 27, 1736.
  - 29 July: Rococo French Reformed Church inaugurated.
- 1740 – French Reformed preachers houses built.
- 1756 – Synagogue built.
- 1758
  - 14 January: Forces of the Kingdom of Prussia withdraw from the city.
  - 16 January: Russian forces enter city.
  - 24 January: City becomes part of Russia.
- 1764 – Russian occupation ends.
- 1765 – Gumbinnen Gate built.
- 1780 – Theodor Gottlieb von Hippel becomes mayor.
- 1787 – French Reformed secondary school founded.
- 1790 – Königshalle built.

== 19th century ==
- 1804 – 12 February: Death of Immanuel Kant, philosopher.
- 1806 – Last Polish Reformed service held.
- 1807
  - French in power.
  - Members of the French congregation persuaded Napoleon to reduce war contributions from 20 to 12 million francs.
  - Reformed Castle Church and French Reformed Church used as a military hospitals.
- 1809 – Paradeplatz city garden established.

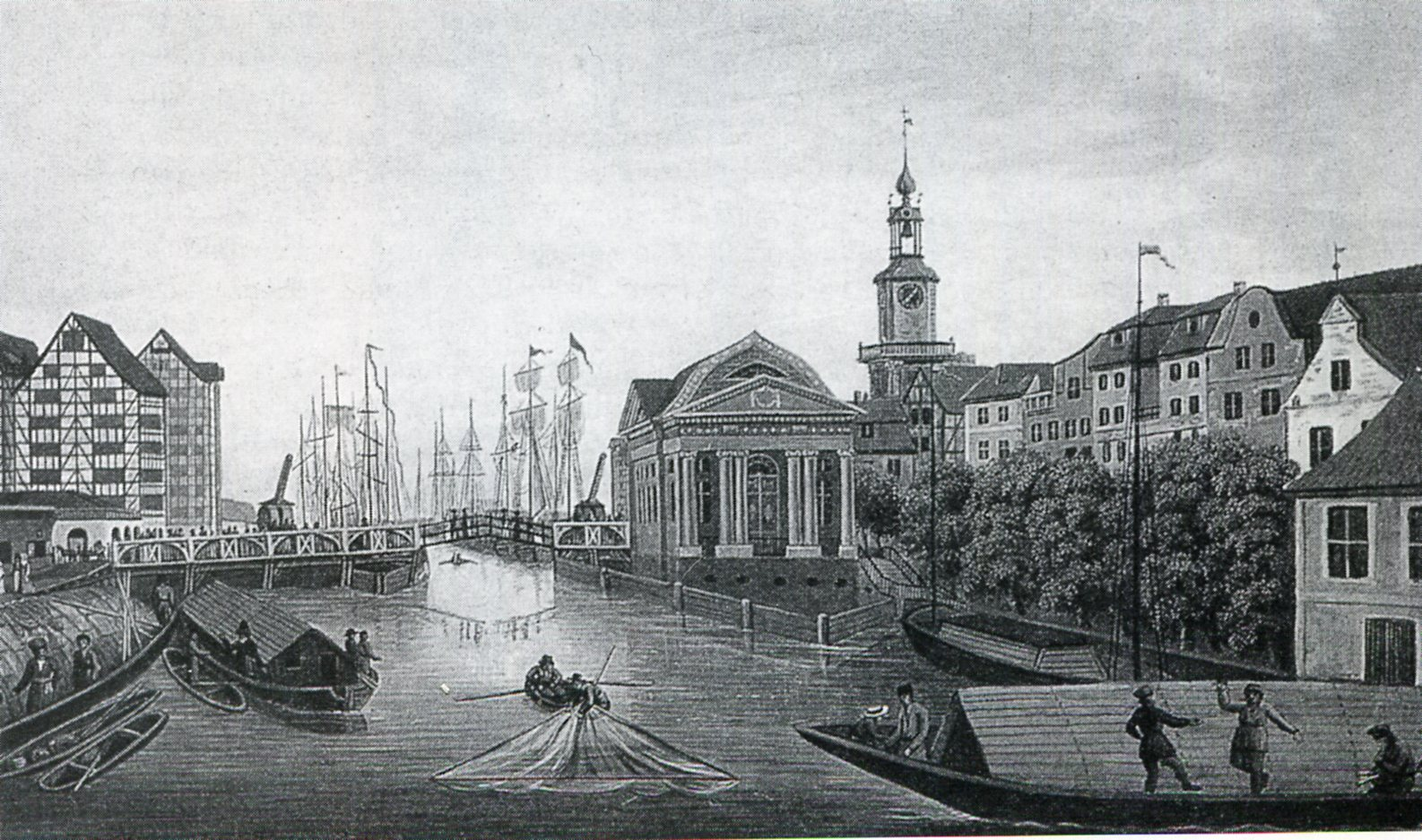
View of the city from circa 1810

- 1810 – August Wilhelm Heidemann becomes mayor.
- 1812 – School of church music founded.
- 1813 – Koenigsberg Observatory built.
- 1814 – Carl Friedrich Horn becomes mayor.
- 1817 – Polish-language services discontinued in the Cathedral, Löbenicht Church and Altstadt Church.
- 1821 – Polish removed from the curriculum of the Reformed school.
- 1825 – French Reformed secondary school closed.
- 1826 – Johann Friedrich List becomes mayor.
- 1828 – Royal and University Library formed.
- 1830 – Population: 54,000.
- 1831 – Polish poet Wincenty Pol interned in the city following the unsuccessful Polish November Uprising. He wrote his first poems there.
- 1832 – French Reformed elementary school closed.
- 1833 – University's Department of Chemistry opens in Neurossgarten.
- 1835 – Nowiny o Rozszerzeniu Wiary Chrześcijańskiej Polish-language Christian magazine begins publication.
- 1838 – Rudolf von Auerswald becomes mayor.
- 1843 – Polish Reformed Congregation dissolved.
- 1845
  - Union Giesserei foundry in business.
  - New Altstadt Church dedicated.
  - Art academy opens.
- 1851 – Grolman Bastion built.
- 1855
  - Sailing Club founded.
  - Rossgarten Gate rebuilt.
- 1856 – Königsberg Cathedral restored.
- 1858 – Dohna Tower built.
- 1860 – Astronomic Bastion built.
- 1861
  - 18 October: Coronation of William I, German Emperor, in the Schlosskirche.
  - Albertina University new campus dedicated.
- 1862 – The city becomes a center of Polish preparations for a planned Polish uprising.
- 1863–1864 – Arms trafficking for Polish insurgents during the January Uprising in the Russian Partition of Poland, co-organized by Wojciech Kętrzyński.
- 1863
  - 2 January: Pruski Przyjaciel Ludu Polish-language newspaper begins publication.
  - 1 August: Piotr Drzewiecki becomes the leader of the local Polish insurgent organization, succeeding Kazimierz Szulc, who was forced to flee pursued by the Prussian authorities.
  - 9 August and 22 August: Prussian authorities seize weapons intended for Polish insurgents.
- 1864 – 1 February: The Polish uprising committee begins publication of the Głos z Litwy Polish-language newspaper.
- 1867 – Population: 101,507.
- 1875
  - Johann Karl Adolf Selke becomes mayor.
  - Königsberg Stock Exchange built in Vorstadt.
- 1878 – Königsberger Allgemeine Zeitung (newspaper) in publication.
- 1880
  - Bronsart Fort built.
  - Population: 140,800.
- 1883 – High Bridge rebuilt.
- 1886 – Siemering Museum established.
- 1889 – Eisenbahnbrücke (bridge) opens.

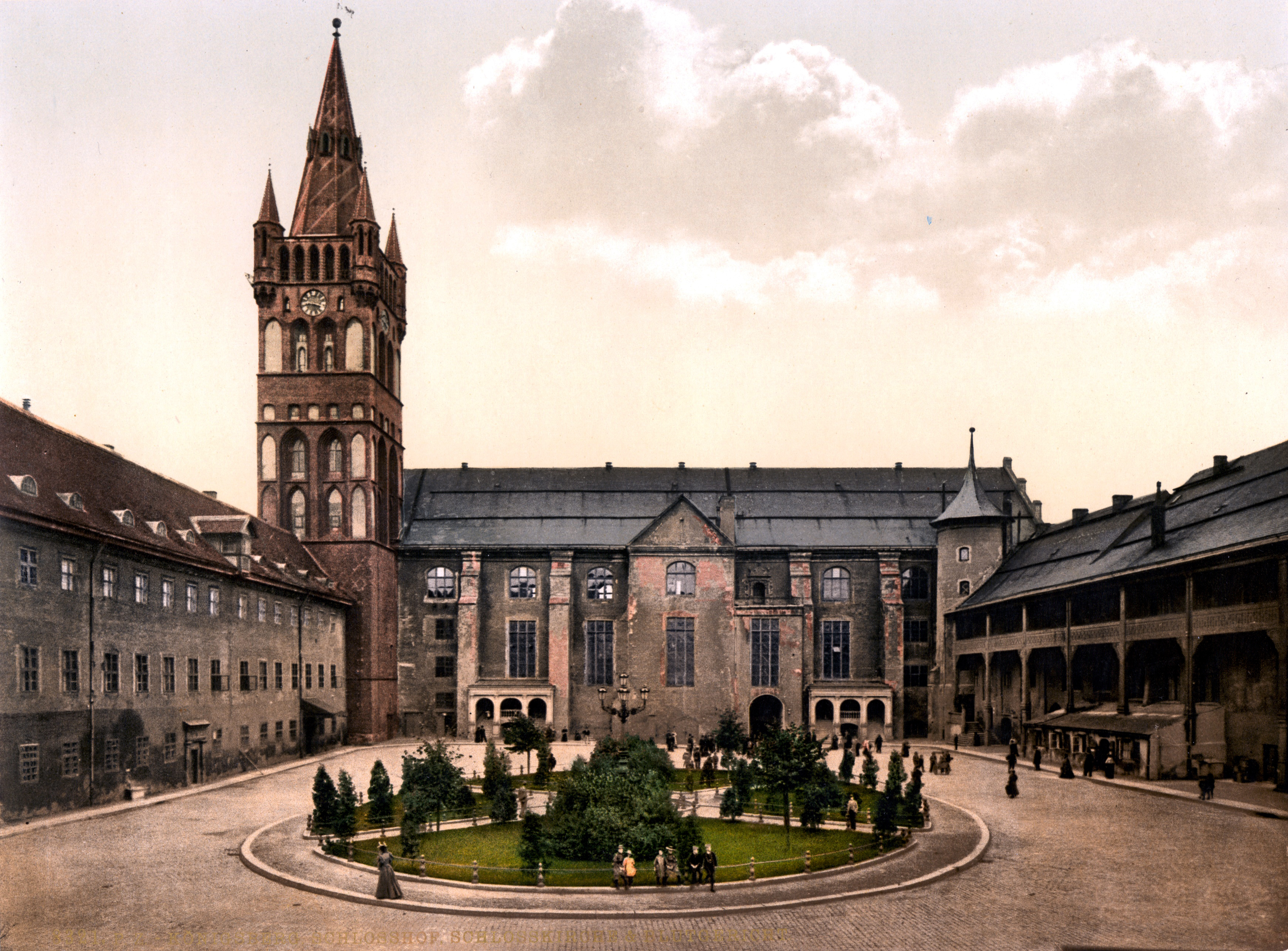
Königsberg Castle in the 1890s

- 1890 – Population: 161,666.
- 1892 – Baltika Stadium opens.
- 1893 – Hermann Theodor Hoffmann becomes mayor.
- 1896 – Zoo founded.
- 1897 – Königsberger Tageblatt (newspaper) in publication.
- 1898 – Palaestra Albertina established.
- 1900
  - Football Club Königsberg formed.
  - Population: 187,897.

== 20th century ==
=== 1900-1945 ===
- 1901
  - Queen Louise Memorial Church and Pillau-Königsberg canal built.
  - Königsberger Volkszeitung (newspaper) in publication.
- 1903 – Siegfried Körte becomes mayor.
- 1905 - Population: 219,862.
- 1906 – Bismarck tower built near city.
- 1907 – Church of the Holy Family built.
- 1912 – Stadthalle opens.
- 1913
  - New Tragheim Church dedicated.
  - Kunsthalle Königsberg (art gallery) opens.
- 1914 – City bombed by Russian forces.
- 1919
  - Hans Lohmeyer becomes mayor.
  - City becomes part of the German Reich.
  - Population: 260,895.
- 1920 – 24 April: Consulate of Poland opened.
- 1921 – Königsberg Devau Airport opens.

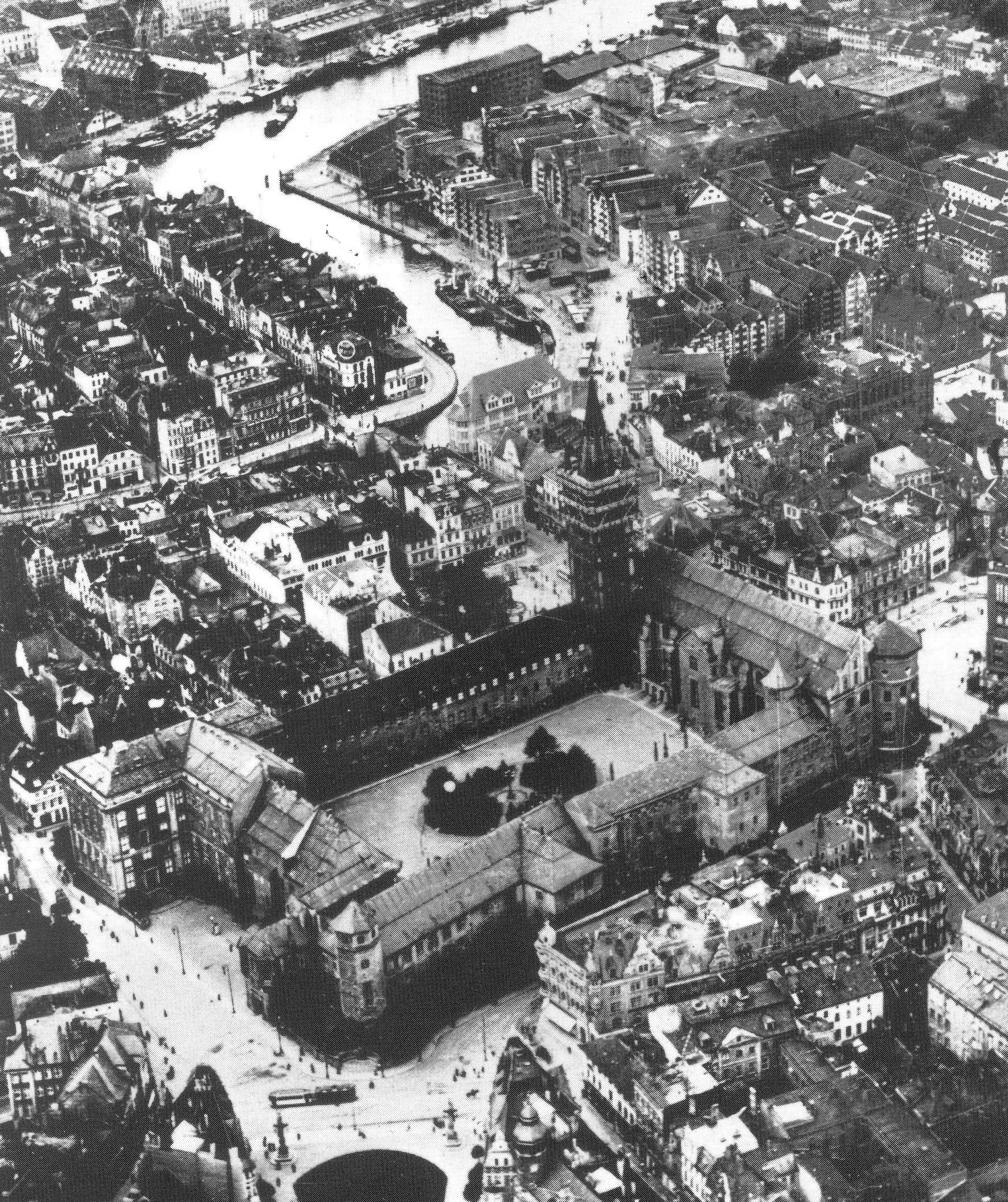
Aerial view of the castle and city centre in 1925

- 1927 – City Hall relocated to Hansaplatz.
- 1928 – Königsberg City Museum opens.
- 1929 – Central railway terminal opens.
- 1931 – Last Polish book in the pre-1945 city published.
- 1933 – Hellmuth Will becomes mayor.
- 1934 – Hansaplatz renamed Adolf-Hitler-Platz.
- 1936 – Polnische Gasse ("Polish Street") is renamed to erase traces of Polish presence.
- 1939
  - Lasch Bunker built in Paradeplatz.
  - Population: 368,433.
  - 25 August: The local Gestapo issued an arrest warrant for all Polish teachers in the region.
  - August–September: Persecution of Poles, incl. mass arrests of Polish students and arrests of local Polish consul Jerzy Warchełowski and attaché Witold Winiarski.
  - October: The Germans established a forced labour camp for Romani people.
- 1941
  - 18 January: 74 Polish-Teutonic documents from the 13th-15th centuries, stolen by the German occupiers from Warsaw, were transferred to the archives in Königsberg (later relocated elsewhere, and restored to Poland in 2025).
  - 1 September: Aerial bombing by Soviet forces begins.
- 1942 – 24 June: The Nazi SS sends the first deportation of Jews from Königsberg and the province of East Prussia to extermination camps.
- 1944
  - August: Aerial bombing by British forces; city extensively damaged.
  - 19 August: The Germans established a subcamp of the Stutthof concentration camp, in which around 500 Jews were subjected to forced labour.
- 1945
  - January: Subcamp of the Stutthof concentration camp dissolved.
  - January: Battle of Königsberg begins.
  - February: Metgethen massacre.
  - 9 April: Battle of Königsberg ends; Soviets in power.

=== 1946-1990s ===
- 1946
  - April: City becomes part of the Russian Soviet Federative Socialist Republic, per Potsdam Agreement.
  - City renamed Kaliningrad after Bolshevik Mikhail Kalinin.
  - City becomes seat of the newly formed Kaliningrad Oblast.
  - Kaliningrad Regional Museum of History and Arts founded.
  - Kaliningradskaya Pravda newspaper begins publication.
- 1947 – Kaliningrad Regional Drama Theatre established.
- 1954 – Pishchevik Kaliningrad football club formed.
- 1956 – Population: 188,000.

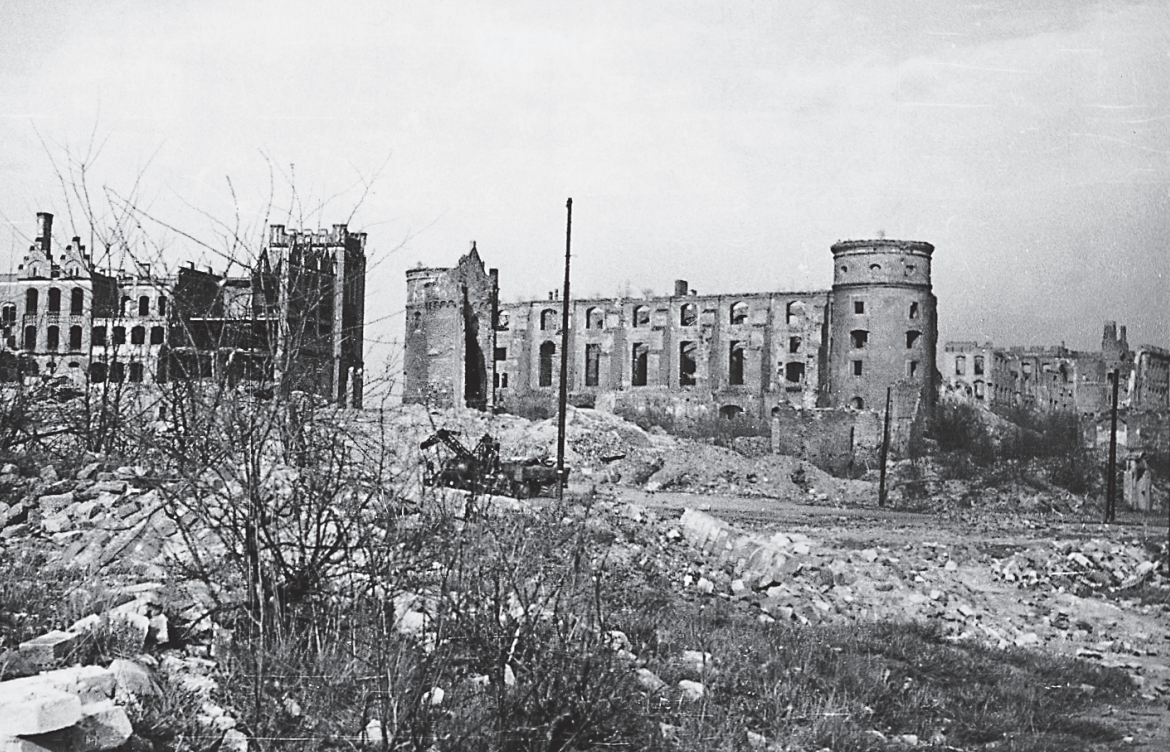
Castle ruins in the 1960s

- 1960 – Theatre on Mira Avenue rebuilt.
- 1965 - Population: 253,000.
- 1967
  - Kaliningrad State University active.
  - French Reformed Church demolished.
- 1979
  - Khrabrovo Airport terminal built.
  - Kaliningrad Amber Museum opens.
- 1985 - Population: 385,000.
- 1988 – Kaliningrad State Art Gallery established.
- 1989 – Population: 401,280; oblast 871,283.
- 1990
  - Chamber of Commerce founded.
  - City opens to foreign tourists.
- 1994 – Kaliningrad State Technical University active.
- 1996 – Leonid Gorbenko becomes governor of Kaliningrad Oblast.
- 1998 – Głos znad Pregoły (The Voice from the Pregel) Polish-language magazine in publication.

== 21st century ==
- 2001 – Vladimir Yegorov becomes governor of Kaliningrad Oblast.
- 2005
  - July: 750th anniversary of city founding.
  - Kaiser Bridge reconstructed (approximate date).
  - Georgy Boos becomes governor of Kaliningrad Oblast.
- 2007
  - Alexander Jaroschuk becomes mayor.
  - Khrabrovo Airport new terminal opens.
- 2008 – Cathedral of Christ the Saviour consecrated.
- 2010
  - 30 January: Protest against governor Georgy Boos.
  - Population: 431,500; oblast 941,873.
  - Nikolay Tsukanov becomes governor of Kaliningrad Oblast.
- 2012 – Poland-Russia border near Kaliningrad Oblast opens.

== See also ==
- History of Kaliningrad
- Königsberg
- List of monarchs of Prussia, 1525-1701
- Timelines of other cities in the Northwestern Federal District of Russia: Pskov, St. Petersburg

== Bibliography ==
=== in English ===
Published in the 18th-19th century

- Thomas Nugent (1749), "Königsberg", The Grand Tour, vol. 2: Germany and Holland, London: S. Birt, hdl:2027/mdp.39015030762572
- Richard Brookes (1786), "Konigsburg", The General Gazetteer (6th ed.), London: J.F.C. Rivington
- Jedidiah Morse; Richard C. Morse (1823), "Königsberg", A New Universal Gazetteer (4th ed.), New Haven: S. Converse
- Augustus Bozzi Granville (1829). "(Königsberg)". St. Petersburgh: A journal of travels to and from that capital. H. Colburn.
- "Königsberg", Leigh's New Descriptive Road Book of Germany, London: Leigh and Son, 1837
- "Königsberg". Penny Cyclopaedia. London. 1839.
- "Königsberg". Handbook for North Germany. London: J. Murray. 1877.
- John Ramsay McCulloch (1880), "Königsberg", in Hugh G. Reid (ed.), A Dictionary, Practical, Theoretical and Historical of Commerce and Commercial Navigation, London: Longmans, Green, and Co.
- W. Pembroke Fetridge (1884), "Königsberg", Harper's Hand-Book for Travellers in Europe and the East (23rd ed.), New York: Harper & Brothers, hdl:2027/nyp.33433066588363
- "Königsberg", Bradshaw's Illustrated Hand-book to Germany and Austria, London: W.J. Adams & Sons, 1896

Published in the 20th century

- "Königsberg" . Encyclopædia Britannica. Vol. 15 (11th ed.). 1910. pp. 894–895.
- "Kaliningrad", Scandinavian & Baltic Europe (4th ed.), Lonely Planet, 1999, p. 300+, OL 8314793M
- James Charles Roy (1999). The Vanished Kingdom: Travels Through the History of Prussia. Basic Books. ISBN 978-0-8133-3793-7.
- Olga Sezneva (2000). "Historical Representation and the Politics of Memory in Kaliningrad, Former Königsberg". Polish Sociological Review (131): 323–338. JSTOR 41274763.

Published in the 21st century

- Peter Savodnik (2003). "Kaliningrad". Wilson Quarterly. 27 (2): 16–22. JSTOR 40261179.
- Ann Kennard (2010). "Case Study 1: Kaliningrad". Old Cultures, New Institutions: Around the New Eastern Border of the European Union. LIT Verlag Münster. pp. 133–161. ISBN 978-3-643-10751-0.
- Eaton, Nicole. German Blood, Slavic Soil: How Nazi Königsberg Became Soviet Kaliningrad (Cornell University Press, 2023) online review of this book

=== in other languages ===
- Karl Faber (1840). Die Haupt- und Residenz-Stadt Königsberg in Preußen [Capital and Residence City of Königsberg in Prussia] (in German). Königsberg: Gräfe und Unzer.
- Alexander Jung (1846). Königsberg und die Königsberger (in German). Leipzig: Hermann Kirchner.
- F.W. Schubert (1855). Zur sechshundertjährigen Jubelfeier der Stadt Königsberg [600th Jubilee Celebration of the City of Königsberg] (in German). Königsberg: Verlag von Schubert und Seidel.
- "Konigsberg". Biblioteca geographica: Verzeichniss der seit der Mitte des vorigen Jahrhunderts bis zu Ende des Jahres 1856 in Deutschland (in German). Leipzig: Wilhelm Engelmann. 1858. (bibliography)
- August Wilhelm Grube (1875). "Königsberg". Charakterbilder Deutschen Landes und Lebens fur Schule und Haus (in German) (10th ed.). Leipzig: F. Brandstetter.
- "Königsberg". Brockhaus' Konversations-Lexikon (in German) (14th ed.). Leipzig: Brockhaus. 1898.
- Gresch, Eberhard (2012). Im Blickpunkt der Geschichte der Reformation: Evangelisch-Reformierte in (Ost-)Preußen (in German).
- P. Krauss; E. Uetrecht, eds. (1913). "Konigsberg". Meyers Deutscher Städteatlas [Meyer's Atlas of German Cities] (in German). Leipzig: Bibliographisches Institut.
- "Konigsberg", Deutscher Städteatlas (in German), vol. 2, Institut für vergleichende Städtegeschichte, 1979, ISBN 3891150008
- Małłek, Janusz (1992). "Polityka miasta Królewca wobec Polski w latach 1525–1701". Komunikaty Mazursko-Warmińskie (in Polish). No. 3–4.
- Biskup, Marian (1992). "Królewiec a Polska i Litwa jagiellońska w czasach średniowiecza (do roku 1525)". Komunikaty Mazursko-Warmińskie (in Polish). No. 3–4.* Podbereski, Wacław (2010). "Królewiec – Koenigsberg – Kaliningrad". Znad Wilii (in Polish). Vol. 4, no. 44. ISSN 1392-9712.
- Wolfgang Adam; Siegrid Westphal, eds. (2012). "Königsberg". Handbuch kultureller Zentren der Frühen Neuzeit: Städte und Residenzen im alten deutschen Sprachraum (in German). De Gruyter. pp. 1153+. ISBN 978-3-11-029555-9.
