= Theodor Gottlieb von Hippel =

Theodor Gottlieb von Hippel may refer to:

- Theodor Gottlieb von Hippel the Elder (1741–1796), German satirical writer
- Theodor Gottlieb von Hippel the Younger (1775–1843), Prussian statesman, his nephew
