= Schloßkirche =

Schloßkirche or Schlosskirche (German: "Castle Church") may refer to:

- Schlosskirche, Königsberg
- All Saints' Church, Wittenberg
