= Timeline of Pskov =

The following is a timeline of the history of the city of Pskov, Russia.

== Prior to 20th century ==
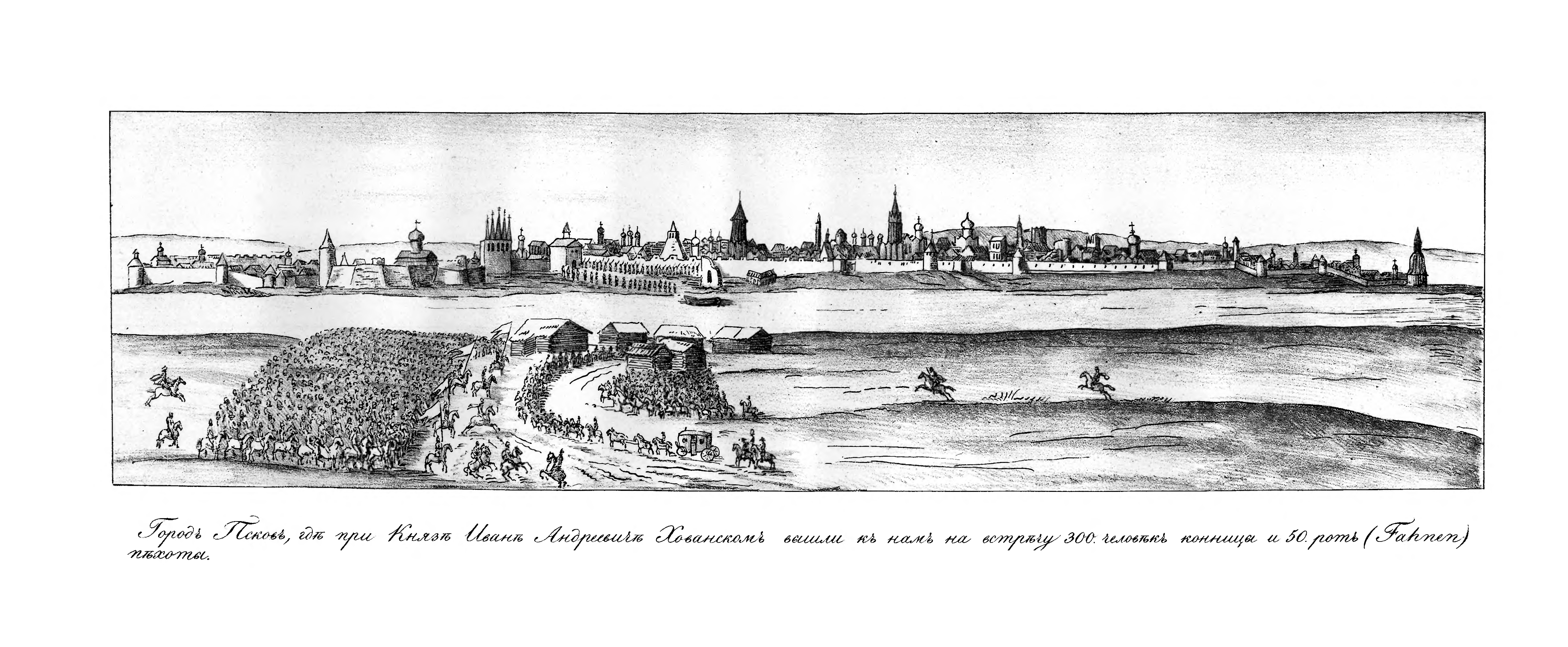
Pskov in 1661

- 903 - Pleskov first mentioned.
- 1156 - Mirozhsky Monastery established.
- 1168 - Plotnitskii borough created.
- 1212 - Partially burned by an Estonian raid under Lembitu.
- 1240 - City captured by the Livonian Brothers of the Sword.
- 1266 - City wall constructed by Daumantas of Pskov.
- 14th C. Joined the Hanseatic League.
- 1348 - City becomes independent from the Novgorod Republic per Treaty of Bolotovo.
- 1473 - Cave Church of the Dormition of the Theotokos built.
- 1510 - City taken by forces of Basil Ivanovich of the Grand Duchy of Moscow.
- 1540 - Church of St. Peter and St. Paul, Pskov built (approximate date).
- 1579 - Execution of Ivo Schenkenberg, commander of an Estonian partisan unit, which fought against Russia in the Livonian War.
- 1581 - August: Siege of Pskov begins.
- 1582 - February: Siege of Pskov ends.
- 1615 - City besieged by Swedish forces.
- 1650 - Pskov Uprising of 1650.
- 1699 - Trinity Cathedral rebuilt and consecrated.
- 1843 - Catholic church built.
- 1889 - Riga Bridge (Velikaya River) opens.
- 1897 - Population: 29,555.
- 1898 - Bridge built to Zapskovye quarter.

== 20th century ==
- 1903 - Archaeological museum active.
- 1911 - Olginsky Bridge opens.
- 1913 - Population: 38,300.
- 1917 - March: Tsar Nicholas II abdicates while in Pskov.

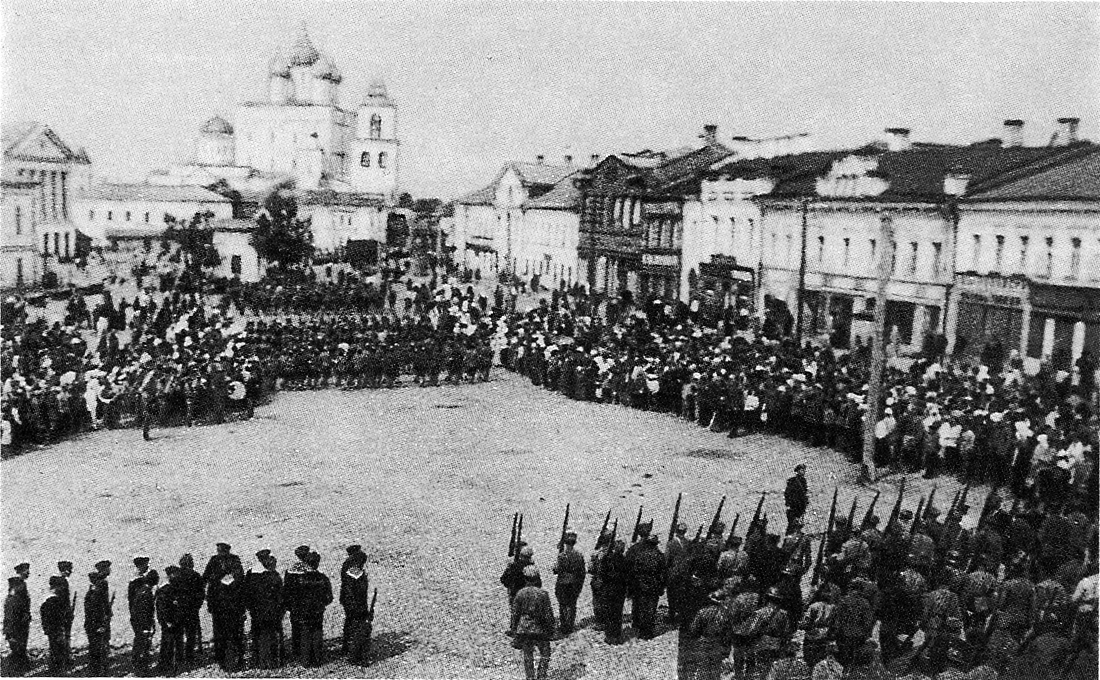
Estonian army parade in 1919

- 1919
  - 25–26 May: Estonian War of Independence – city captured by Estonians.
  - 24 August: Withdrawal of Estonian forces.
  - Soviet Russia in power.
- 1920 - Pskov State Theatre active.
- 1930's - Pskov Airport founded.
- 1939 - Population: 59,898.
- 1940 - June: Soviet 8th Army invaded Estonia and Latvia from the city.
- 1941
  - 9 July: City occupation by German forces begins
  - City renamed "Pleskau."
  - Pskov Orthodox Mission begins.
  - Famine.
  - Dulag transit camp for prisoners of war established by the Germans.
- 1942
  - February: Forced labour camp for Jewish men and women established by the Germans.
  - Stalag 372 prisoner-of-war camp established by the Germans.
- 1943
  - May: Forced labour camp for Jewish men and women dissolved.
  - May: Forced labour camp for men established by the Germans.
  - May: Stalag 372 camp dissolved.
- 1944
  - February: Bombing by Russia, thousands of people killed.
  - 23 July: City occupation by German forces ends.
  - Pskovskaya Pravda newspaper in publication.
- 1958 - Pskov Electric Machine-Building Plant active.
- 1959 - Population: 80,448.
- 1960 - Pskov State Polytechnic Institute established.
- 1965 - Population: 108,000.
- 1967 - Bridge of the 50th Anniversary of October opens.
- 1985 - Population: 194,000.
- 1989 - Population: 203,789.
- 1990 - Alexander Nevsky Bridge, Pskov opens.
- 1991 - August: Soviets launched an attack on Tallinn, Estonia from Pskov during the 1991 Soviet coup d'état attempt.
- 1996 - Yevgeny Mikhailov elected governor of the Pskov Oblast.
- 2000
  - Mikhail Khoronen elected mayor.
  - Catholic cathedral construction begins.
  - City becomes part of the North Western Federal District.

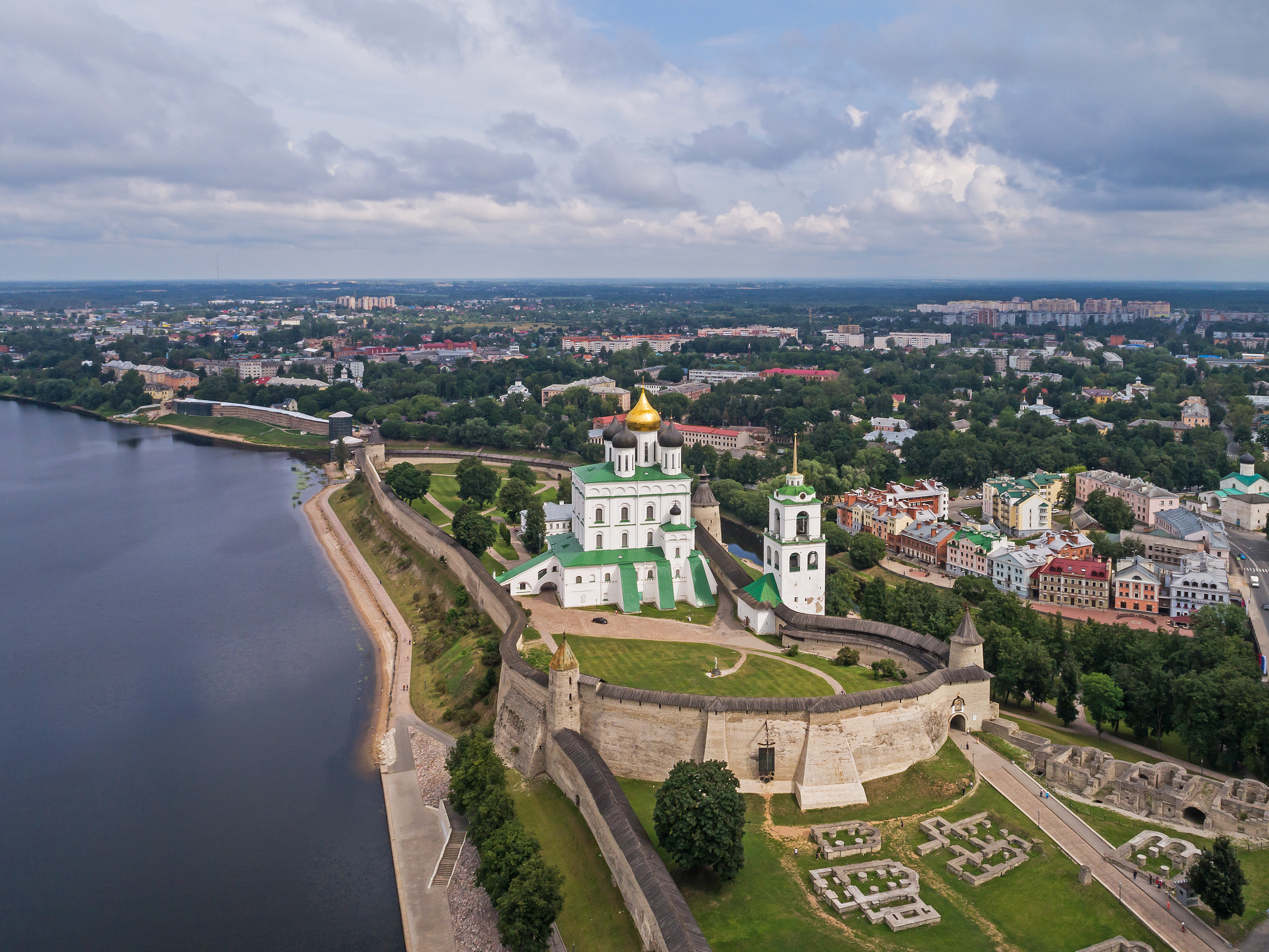
Aerial view of the city center in 2018

== 21st century ==
- 2009 - Ivan Tsetsersky becomes mayor.
- 2010 - Population: 203,279.
- 2010 - Established Pskov State University.

== See also ==
- Pskov history
- History of Pskov
- Other names of Pskov, e.g. Pleskau, Pleskov
- Timelines of other cities in the Northwestern Federal District of Russia: Kaliningrad, St. Petersburg

== Bibliography ==
- Abraham Rees (1819), "Pskov", The Cyclopaedia, London: Longman, Hurst, Rees, Orme & Brown, hdl:2027/mdp.39015057241096 – via HathiTrust
- George Ripley; Charles A. Dana, eds. (1879). "Pskov". American Cyclopedia (2nd ed.). New York: D. Appleton and Company. hdl:2027/hvd.hn585k.
- "Pskof", Hand-book for Travellers in Russia, Poland, and Finland (4th ed.), London: J. Murray, 1888
- Kropotkin, Peter Alexeivitch; Bealby, John Thomas (1910). "Pskov (town)" . Encyclopædia Britannica. Vol. 22 (11th ed.). pp. 542–543.
- "Pskov", Russia, Leipzig: Karl Baedeker, 1914, OCLC 1328163
- William Henry Beable (1919), "Pskov", Russian Gazetteer and Guide, London: Russian Outlook
- Lawrence N. Langer (1984). "The Posadnichestvo of Pskov: Some Aspects of Urban Administration in Medieval Russia". Slavic Review. 43 (1): 46–62. doi:10.2307/2498734. JSTOR 2498734. S2CID 156372600.
- Timothy E. Heleniak (1988). "Russian Soviet Federative Socialist Republic: Northwest Region: Pskov Oblast and City". Bibliography of Soviet Statistical Handbooks. CIR staff paper; no. 42. Washington DC: U.S. Bureau of the Census. hdl:2027/uva.x001867410 – via HathiTrust. (fulltext)
- Trudy Ring, ed. (1995). "Pskov". International Dictionary of Historic Places: Northern Europe. Fitzroy Dearborn. p. 610. ISBN 978-1-136-63944-9.
- Savignac, David (trans). The Pskov 3rd Chronicle.
