= Joachim Ludwig Schultheiss von Unfriedt =

Joachim Ludwig Schultheiss von Unfriedt (variations include Schultheiss von Unfried) (1678 – 10 June 1753) was a German Baroque architect, official, and councillor most active in Königsberg and throughout the Kingdom of Prussia.

== Life ==
Possibly born in Altruppin, Brandenburg, Schultheiss was the son of Joachim Scultetus von Unfried, a privy councilor of Frederick William I, Elector of Brandenburg. He began studying at the University of Frankfurt (Oder) on 23 August 1689 and continued his studies in Italy and France. He became Royal Prussian Engineer and Building Master (Kgl. Preuß. Ingenieur und Baumeister) in Königsberg on 9 January 1702. Schultheiss oversaw the transfer of material from the declining castle in Fischhausen to the fortifications of Pillau until 1705. He was then named Building Director (Baudirektor) on 11 June 1705.

From 1705-13 Schultheiss focused on renovating Königsberg Castle, especially an east wing which was alternately referred to as the Friedrichsbau, the Unfriedbau, and the Unfriedflügel. From 1705-10 he worked on the galleries, royal lodge, and pulpit-altar of the Schlosskirche, the church connected to the castle. Schultheiss designed the Royal Orphanage in Sackheim (1703–05), Tragheim Church (1708–10), and the Brauerhaus in Löbenicht. From 1704-05, along with Jean Baptiste Broebes and Johann Caspar Hindersin, he also aided in the transition of the manor house in Schlobitten into the Schlobitten Palace of the Dohna family. In 1708 he renovated the church of Kaukehmen.

After the coronation of King Frederick William I of Prussia in 1713, Schultheiss took the position of building director in Berlin. He returned to Königsberg after taking the position of building director for the Oberland district on 18 January 1721. The king, who was focused on the recovery of East Prussia after the great plague of 1708-11, tasked Schultheiss with designing the new towns built in the province. He became the most important architectural official in East Prussia and a member of the Kriegs- und Domänenkammer after the king's reorganization of government in 1723.

Schultheiss designed or altered the layouts of numerous East Prussian towns, including Stallupönen (1722); Darkehmen and its 13 morgen market square (1723); Ragnit's old town (1723); Gumbinnen's old town (1724), new town (1727), and town hall (1727); Schirwindt and its market square (ca. 1725); and Pillkallen (ca. 1725). Ca. 1730 he possibly worked on the family grave of Friedrich von der Groeben at the church of Groß Schwansfeld. From 1731-32 he oversaw the rebuilding of the church in Drygallen. Schultheiss designed the Neustädter Reformierte Kirche in Gumbinnen from 1736 to 1739.

In his second period in Königsberg, Schultheiss designed the incomplete Garnisonkirche (garrison church) of the Königsgarten (1731) and the French Reformed Church (1733–36) on Königstraße. He died in Königsberg.

== Gallery ==
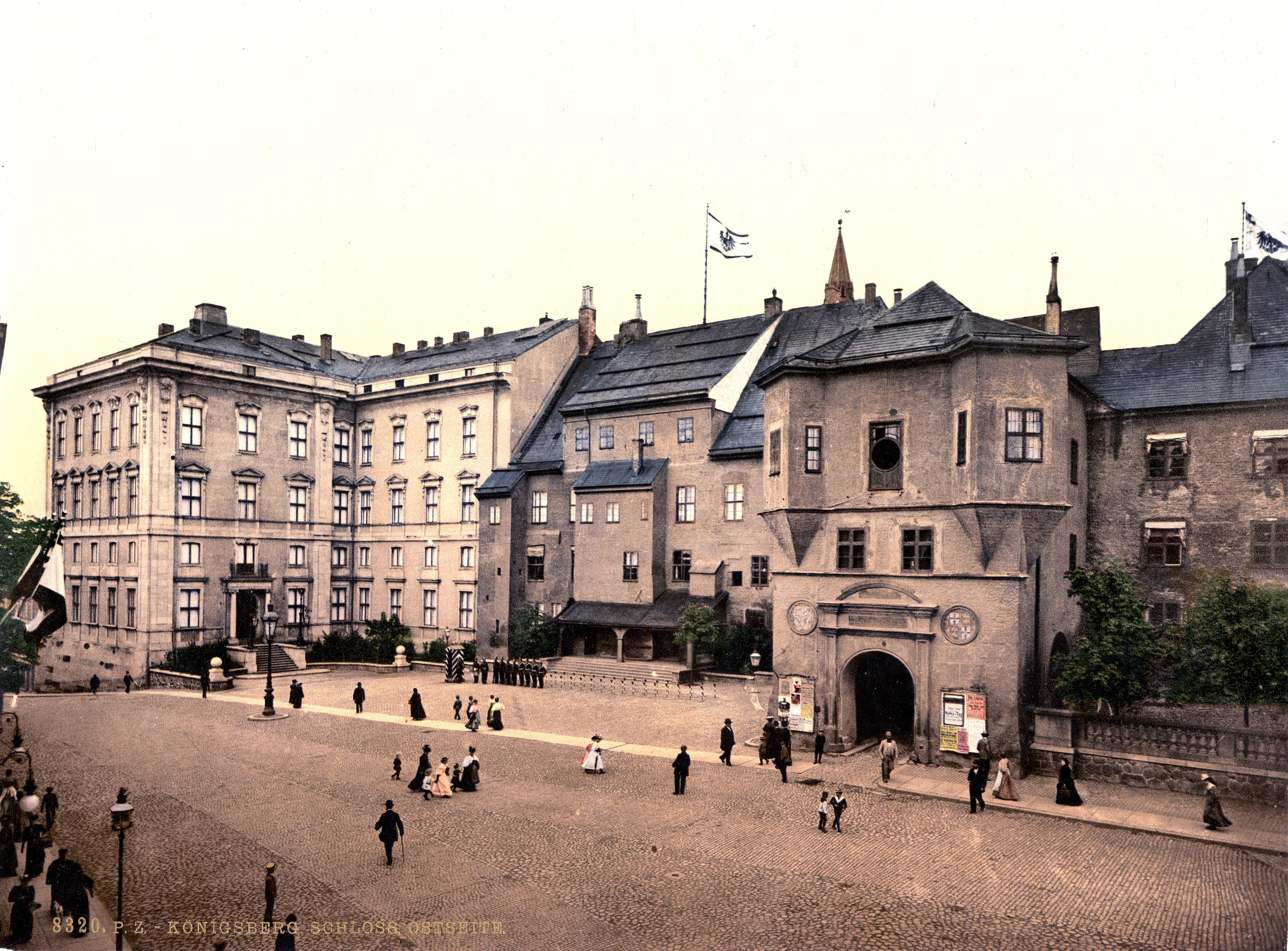
East side of Königsberg Castle

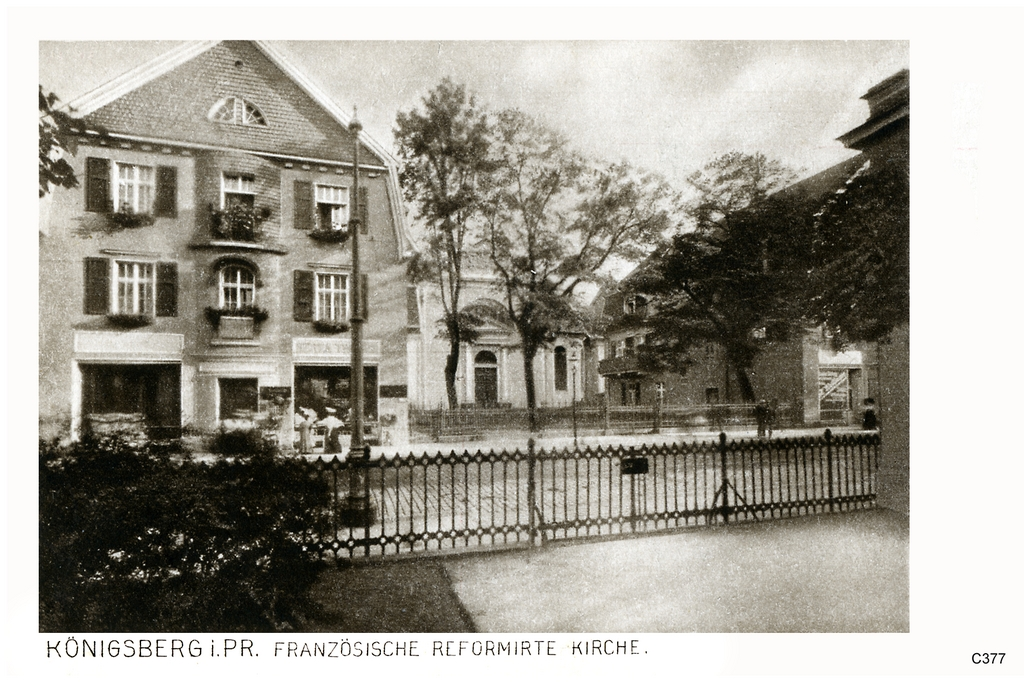
French Reformed Church on Königstraße, eastern Königsberg

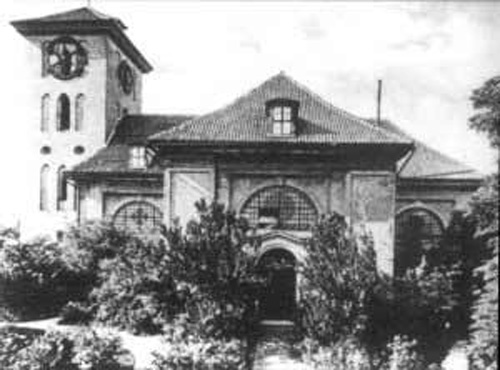
Tragheim Church in Tragheim, northern Königsberg

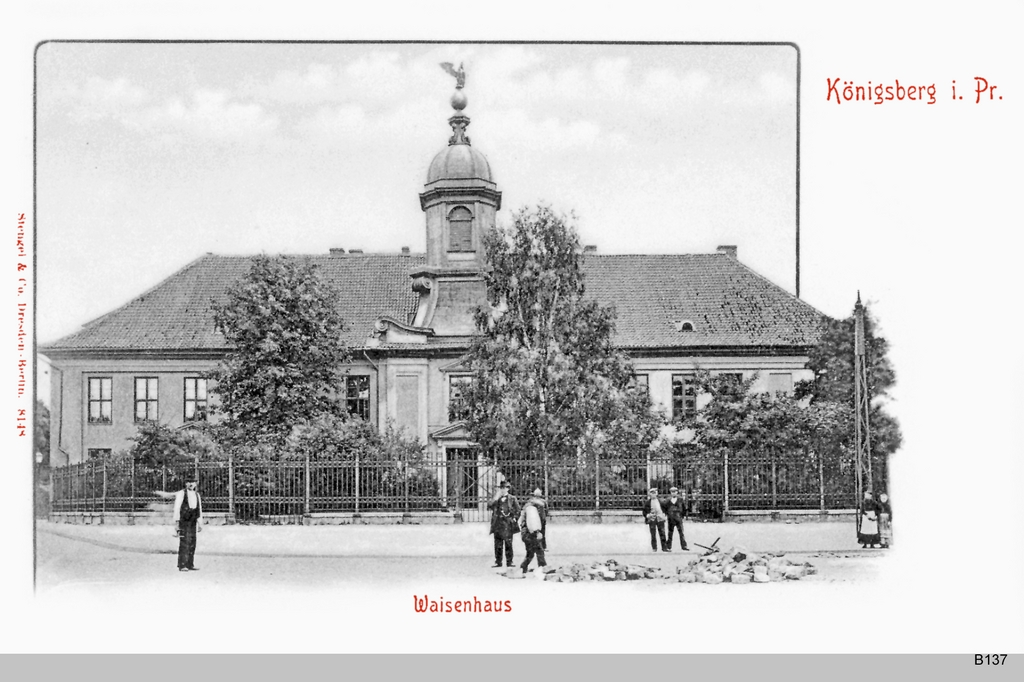
Royal Orphanage in Sackheim, eastern Königsberg

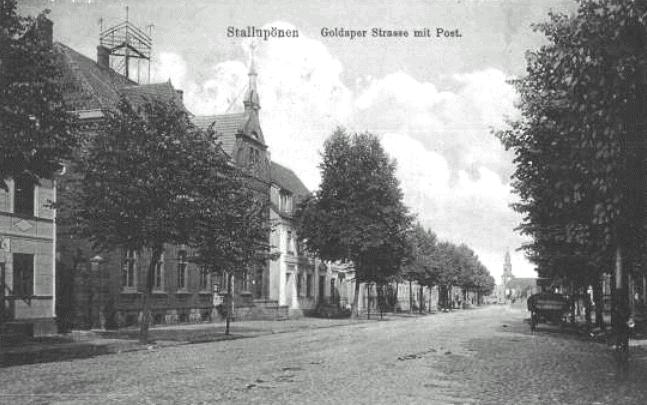
Goldaper Straße leading to the market in Stallupönen

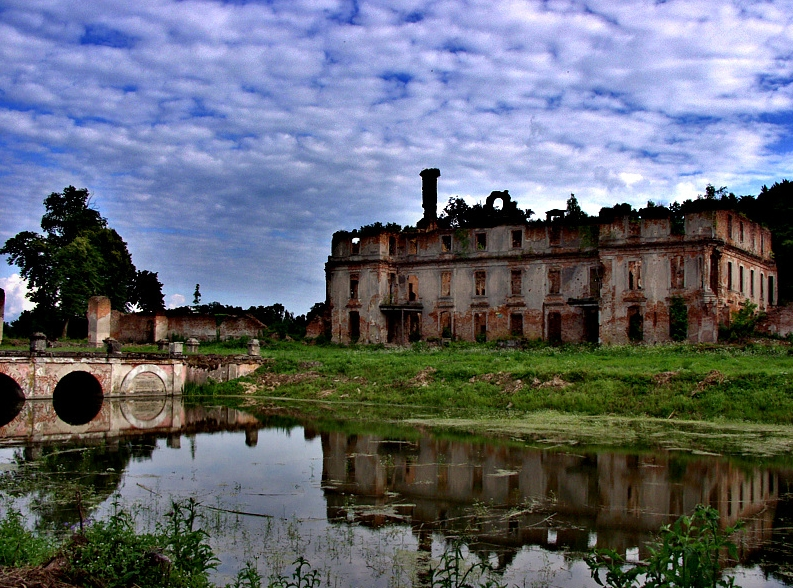
Ruins of the Dohna Palace in modern Słobity, formerly Schlobitten

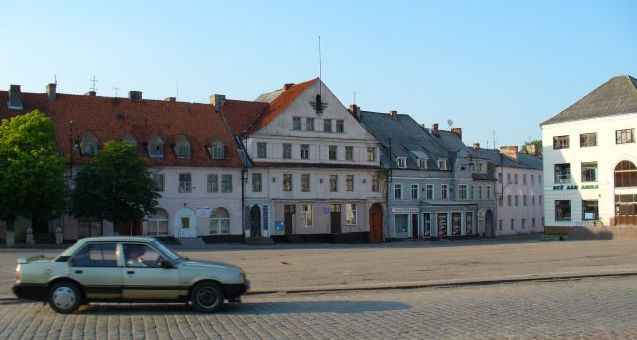
Market square of modern Ozyorsk, formerly Darkehmen
