= An Mein Volk =

1813 Proclamation by Frederick William III

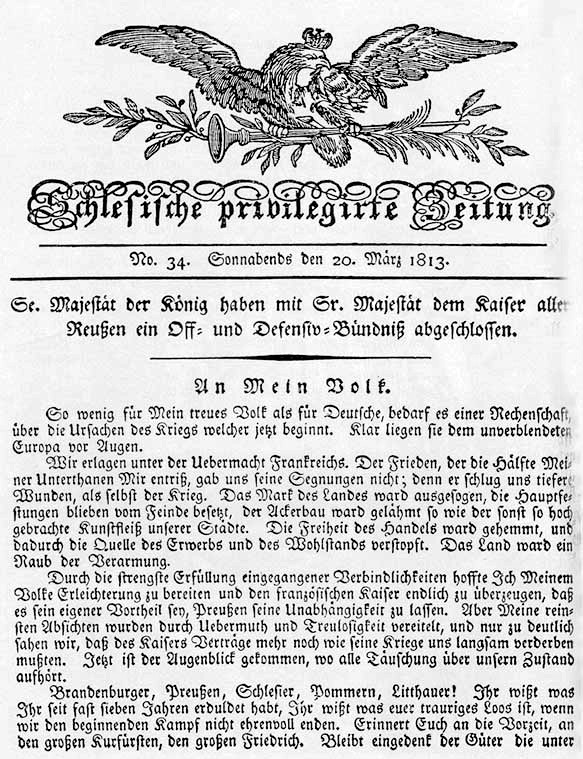
First page of An Mein Volk

The proclamation An Mein Volk ("To my People") was issued by King Frederick William III of Prussia on 17 March 1813 in Breslau (present-day Wrocław, Poland). Addressed to his subjects, Preußen und Deutsche ("Prussians and Germans" — the former term embracing several ethnic groups in Prussia), it appealed for their support in the struggle against Napoleon. Hostilities had been declared the day before.

The document is the first instance of a Prussian monarch directly addressing the public in order to justify his policies. While the Prussian capital Berlin was still occupied by French forces, the proclamation was drafted by the Prussian councillor Theodor Gottlieb von Hippel, and published in the Schlesische privilegirte Zeitung on 20 March 1813.

The proclamation, which affirmed the unity of crown, state and nation, led to the massive expansion of the Prussian Army, and to the creation of militias, Jäger volunteers, and Freikorps units (such as that commanded by Major Adolf von Lützow) fighting in the German Campaign of 1813.

== See also ==
- War of the Sixth Coalition
- Landsturm
