= Johann Josua Mosengel =

German organ builder (1663–1731)

Johann Josua Mosengel (September 16, 1663 – January 18, 1731) was a German pipe organ builder.

Born in 1663 in either Stolzenau or in Eisenach. He created his first independent work in 1695 in Hanover. He then went to Königsberg, Prussia, in 1698 and installed an organ at the Burgkirche between 1698 and 1701 and was responsible for many others in the East Prussia region. He died in Königsberg. A possible son or nephew Gabriel Julius Mosengel (aka Moosengel), also a pipe organ builder, was active in Kuldiga (then Courland, now Latvia) from 1710 until 1730.

During his lifetime Mosengel made about 40 organs and about 20 modifications to existing ones. Few of his works survived the Second World War; in former East Prussia there are only the works in Święta Lipka and in the Evangelical Church of Pasym.
