= Riga Bridge (Velikaya River) =

Railway bridge in Pskov, Russia

Coordinates: 57°47′47″N 28°20′23″E

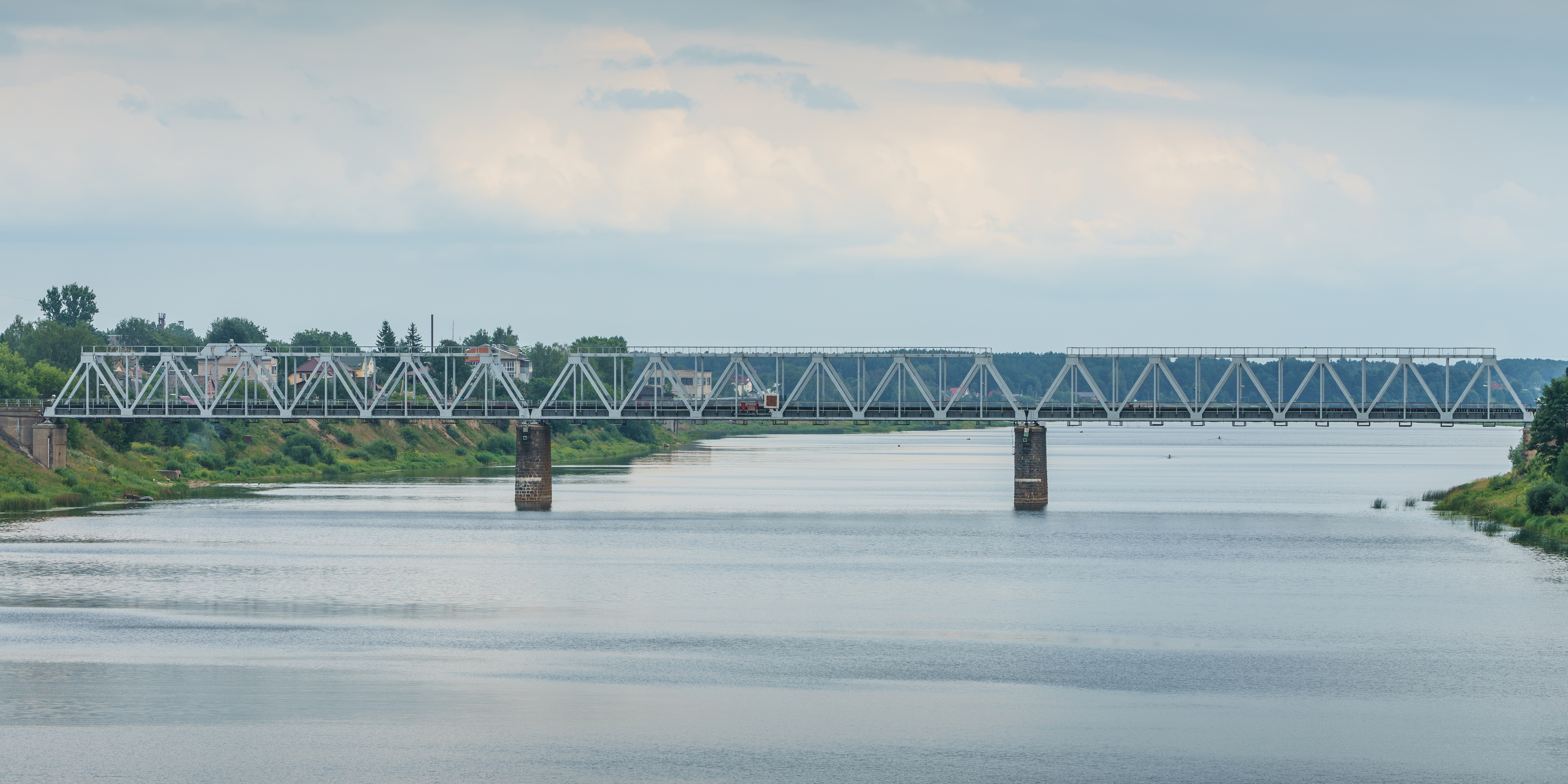
Riga Bridge

The Riga Bridge (Riia sild in Estonian) is a railway bridge that crosses the Velikaya River at Pskov, Russia. It forms part of the branch line from Valga to Tartu of Pskov-Riga Railway.

== History ==
The first railway bridge across the Velikaya River was built in the 1860s in Ostrov, during the construction of the Saint Petersburg-Warsaw Railway. In Pskov, the bridge was laid on 14 September 1886, simultaneously with the construction of a temporary wooden one. The bridge pillars were built in August 1886, construction of the bridge deck took place in July 1888 and the bridge was opened in May 1889. It was designed by engineers Zhuravskiy and Kerbedz. The bridge was partially destroyed during the battle for the Liberation of Pikhva (Pskov) in May 1919 during the Russian Civil War. Estonian troops occupied the area and rebuilt the bridge in July 1919.

During the Second World War, the bridge was blown up twice. The bridge was blown up the first time on 8 July 1941 by Soviet combat engineers, led by lieutenant Semyon Baykov during the retreat of the Red Army, which slowed the advancing German forces. At the moment of the bridge's detonation, a Soviet artillery division was caught on the other side of the river, whom the combat engineers decided to let through. While the soldiers were crossing the bridge, the wire to the explosives was broken by German artillery. Seeing that the explosive had malfunctioned, lieutenant Semyon Baykov sacrificed his life to detonate the explosive using a grenade. He was later posthumously awarded the title of Hero of the Soviet Union.

In July 1944 the bridge was blown up by retreating German forces. From 26 July to 3 August 1944 the bridge was rebuilt by Soviet troops.

== Gallery ==
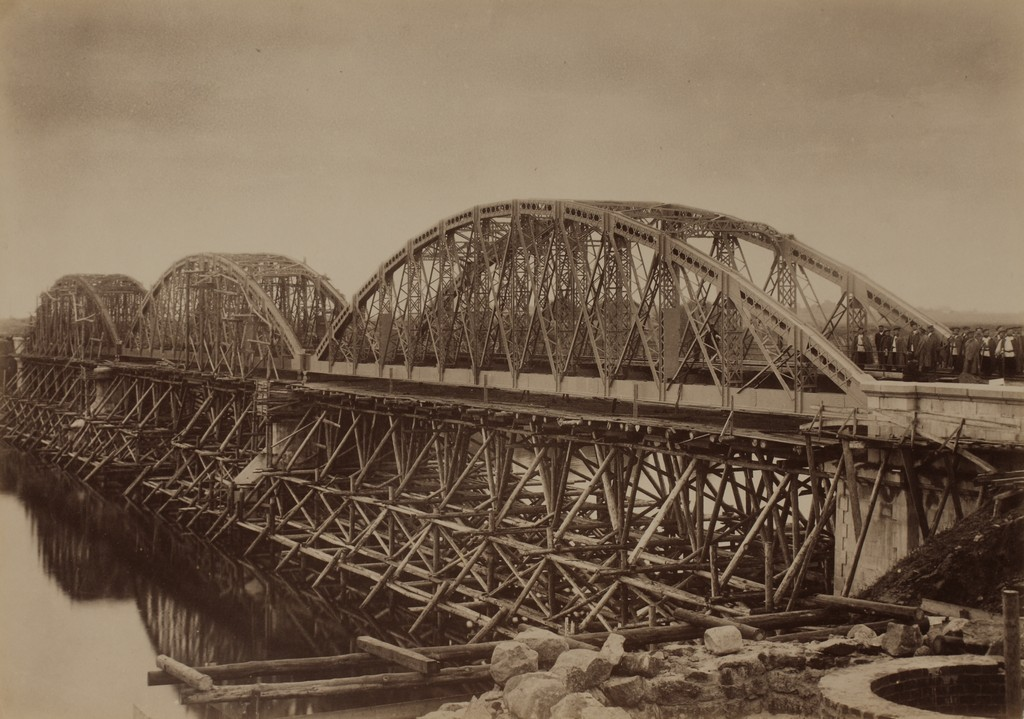
Construction of the bridge deck

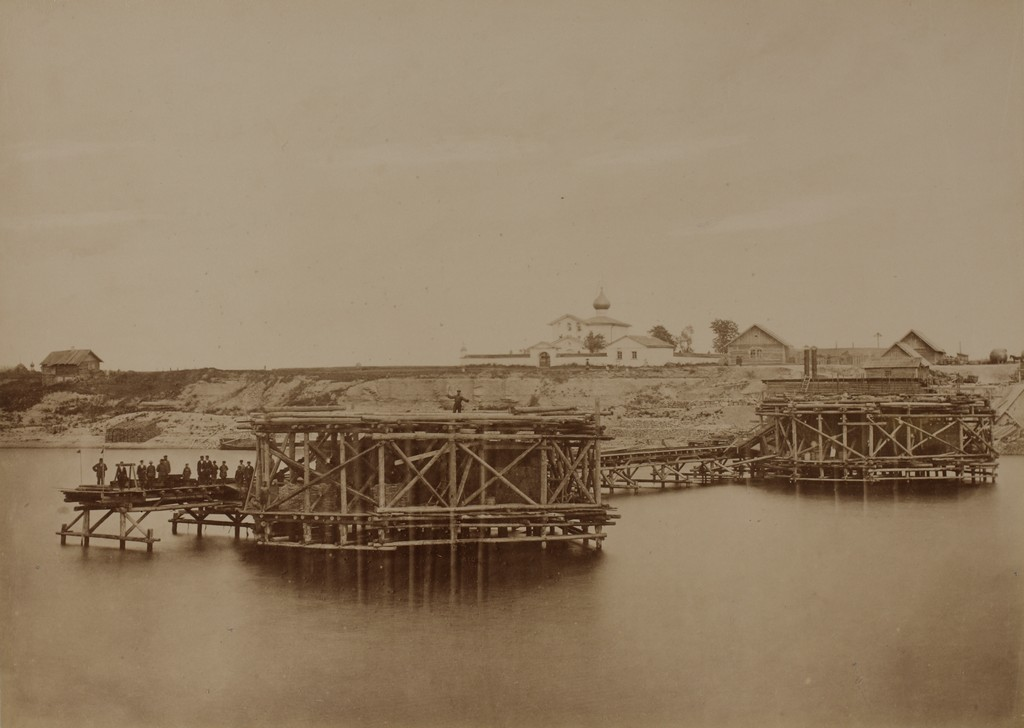
Construction of the pillars

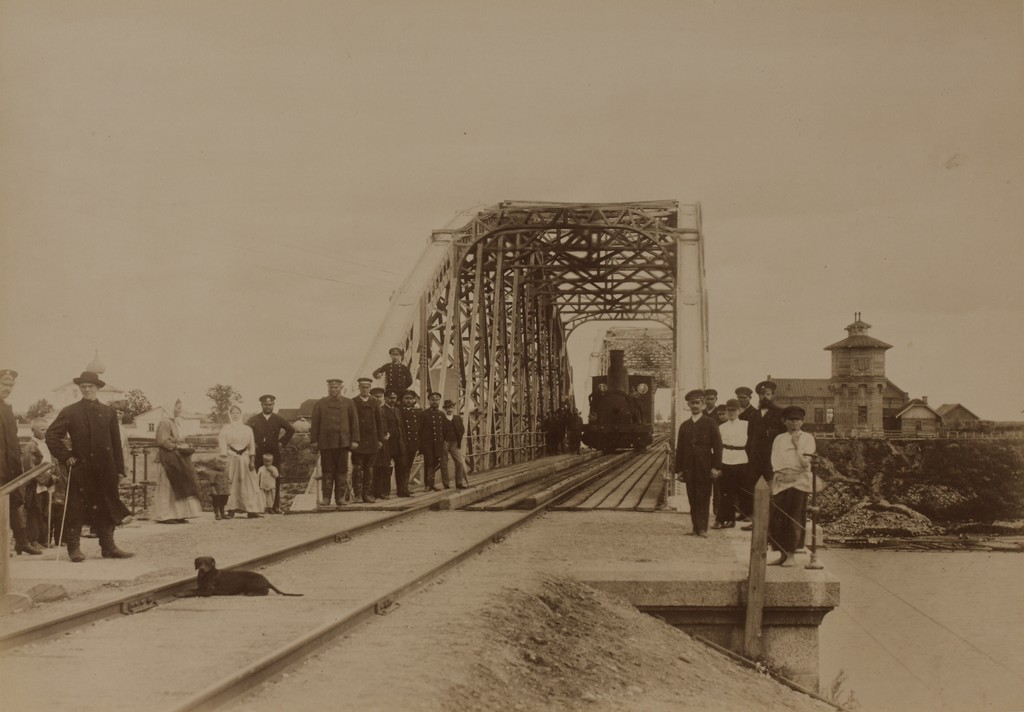
View after completion of the bridge

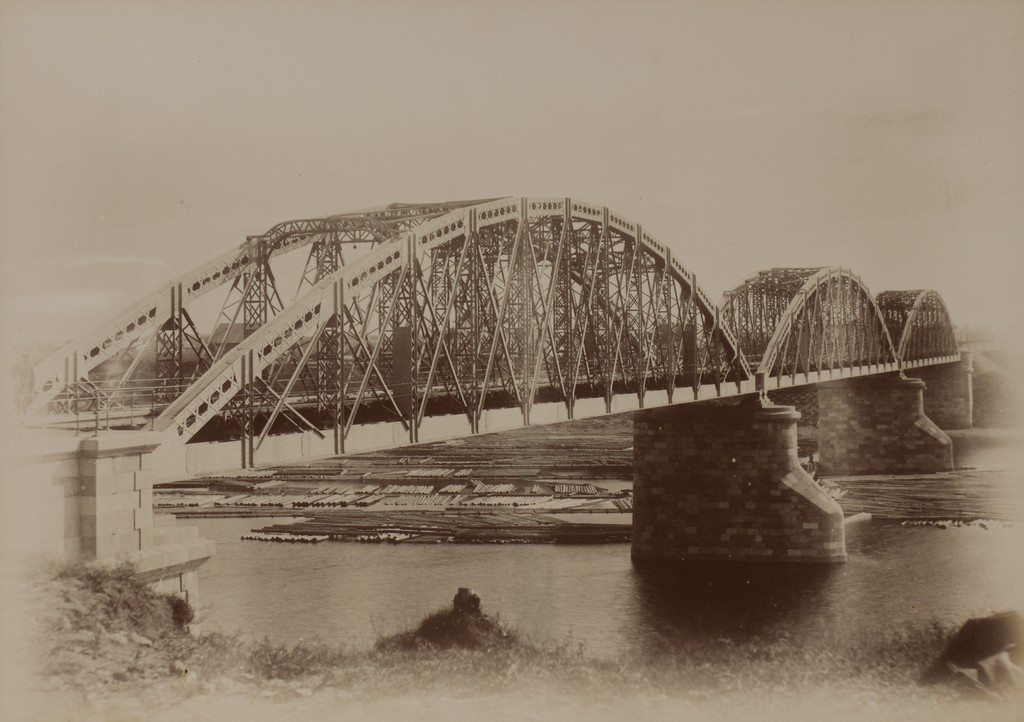
View of the completed bridge in 1889

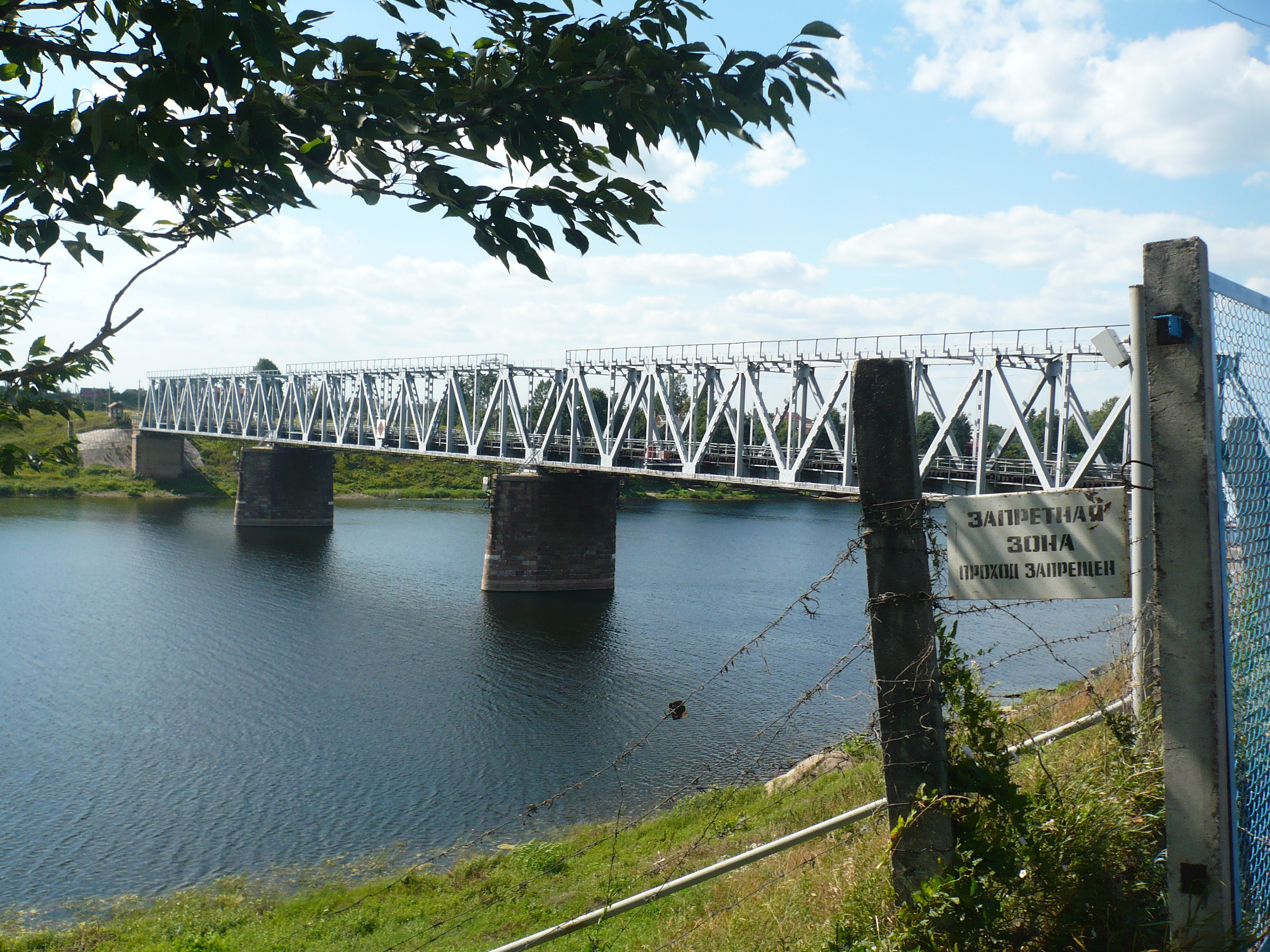
The bridge as photographed in 2011
