= Kaliningrad Regional Museum of History and Arts =

Museum in Kaliningrad, Russia

- Калининградский областной историко-художественный музей
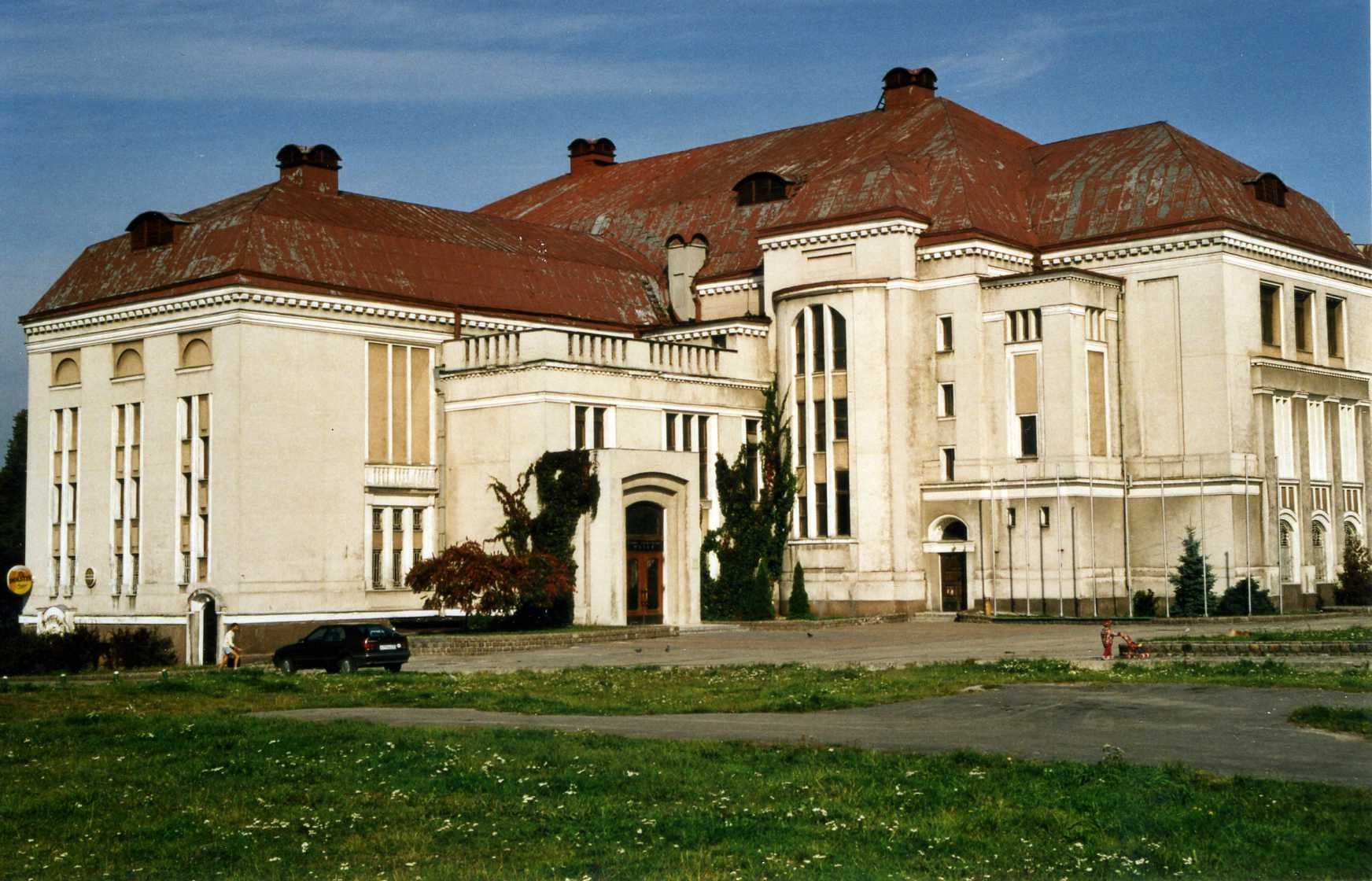
- Regional Museum ca. 2003

- Location in Kaliningrad Region Kaliningrad Regional Museum of History and Arts (Russia)
- Established: 1946
- Coordinates: 54°42′50″N 20°31′07″E
- Website: balticum.ucoz.ru

The Kaliningrad Regional Museum of History and Arts (Russian: Калининградский областной историко-художественный музей) is a museum along the Lower Pond in Kaliningrad, Russia. The building was built in 1912 by Berlin architect, Richard Zeil, originally the city hall (Stadthalle) and also a performing arts center in Königsberg, Germany.

== History ==
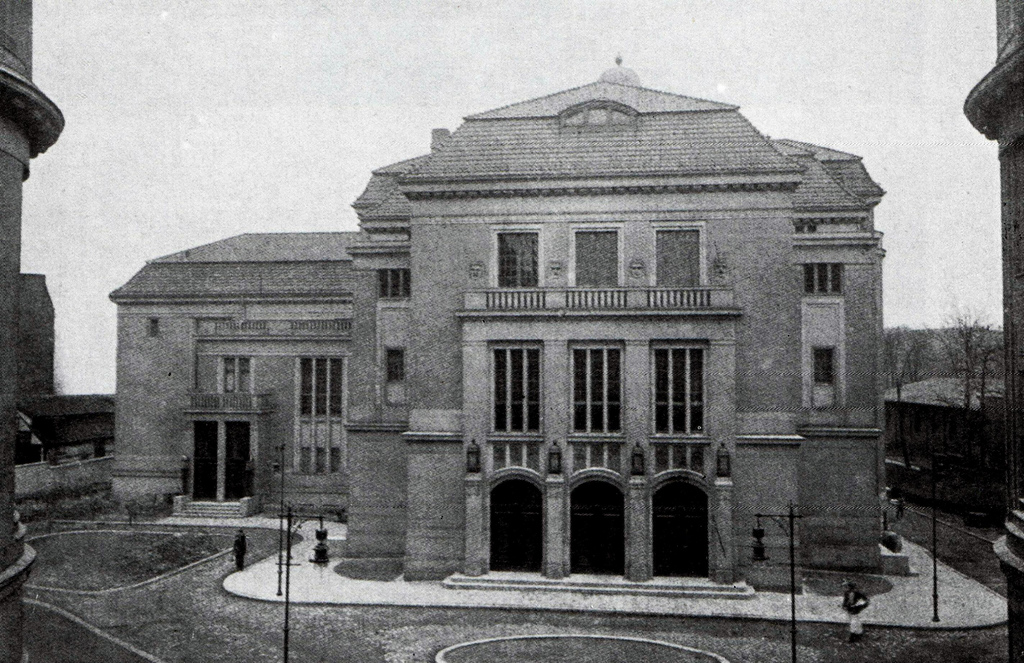
Stadthalle in Königsberg

The Stadthalle was planned by Oberbürgermeister Siegfried Körte in 1907 and opened in the Vorder-Roßgarten district in 1912 according to designs by Richard Seel. It included concert halls (Körtesaal, Krohnesaal, and Gebauhrsaal), a restaurant, and a garden cafe in front of the castle pond Schlossteich. The halls were named after the initiators: Siegfried Körte, Theodor Krohne and Carl Julius Gebauhr. The Königsberger Philharmonie often performed in the 1,600-seat center.

=== World War II ===
The Stadthalle was used as a military hospital during World War I. The building was heavily damaged by the 26 August 1944 Bombing of Königsberg in World War II. After the war it was part of Soviet Kaliningrad.

The former Stadthalle was restored from 1981 to 1986.

== Kaliningrad Regional Museum of History and Arts ==
Since 1991 it has hosted the Kaliningrad Regional Museum of History and Arts. The museum, founded in 1946, previously had multiple locations throughout the city. It includes exhibits on regional nature, archaeology, history, World War II, and post-war Kaliningrad. The museum also has branches in the city and the Kaliningrad Oblast. The museum has five halls, each of which is dedicated to a specific topic.

=== Nature Hall ===
The hall is dedicated to the nature of the Kaliningrad region. Here are animal and bird droppings, minerals from the Kaliningrad region. There are several displays in the hall: the Baltic Sea, the Curonian Lagoon, the Curonian forest, the Poyma River, the bog, the mixed forest.

=== Archeological Hall ===
The archeological hall is dedicated to the earliest era of the region's history. The exhibition includes late Paleolithic, Mesolithic, Neolithic, Bronze Age and Iron Age, until region conversion to Protestantism.

The archaeological site is not only about the ancient Prussia, but also about the Vikings that settled in Prussia in Cranz, (present-day Zelenogradsk).

A large part of the archaeological collection is composed of exhibits from the Prussian Museum, which were considered lost and found. The rest of the items were discovered by Soviet and Russian archeologists after the war.

=== Regional History Hall ===
This hall is dedicated to the history of the region, from the time of the conquest of Prussia by the Teutonic Order Knights (13th century) until 1945. The hall features samples of old weapons, furniture, household items.

=== War Hall ===
The War Hall is dedicated to World War II. It displays examples of weapons, military uniforms and other items related to the war. The hall features a diorama of the "storming of Königsberg".

=== "Memory Horizons" Hall ===
This hall is dedicated to the post-war history of the region. The exhibition features the life and lifestyle of the first residents, products of the first Kaliningrad enterprise, including amber products, as well as dismantled monuments of Lenin.
