= Hieronymus Roth =

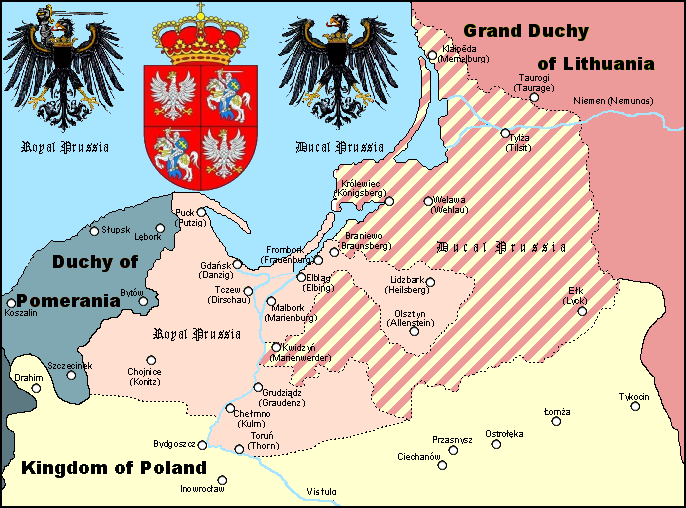
Ducal Prussia, with its capital at Königsberg (Królewiec) of which Roth was a mayor, as fief of the Kingdom of Poland.

Hieronymus Roth (1606–1678) was a lawyer and alderman of Königsberg (Polish: Królewiec, modern day Kaliningrad) who led the city burghers in opposition to Elector Frederick William.

In the Treaty of Oliva of 1660 the Elector had managed to have himself recognized as sovereign in Ducal Prussia and no longer a vassal of the King of Poland. The Prussian Estates and Roth saw this as a step towards tyranny: before, when a conflict between the Estates and the Elector arose, the Estates always had a recourse to a higher authority, the King of Poland, but now this check had been removed. In 1661 the Prussian council, led by Roth, repudiated the Treaty of Oliva, stating that the transfer of sovereignty from Poland to the Elector was not valid without their consent. Roth then sent a plea to the King of Poland John II Casimir Vasa, asking for assistance. Furthermore, Roth and the burghers objected to Frederick's requirement that henceforth the Prussian Estates could meet only with his approval, and to the higher taxes the Elector had levied without their consent. As a result, Königsberg and her council refused to make an oath of allegiance to the Elector, and sent letters to the Polish king in Warsaw asking if they could "become Polish subjects once more, as (they) had been in the past".

However, with no help for the burghers immediately forthcoming from the King of Poland, in October 1662 Frederick William arrived in Königsberg with two thousand soldiers and had Roth arrested, swearing that Roth would be "interrogated tomorrow, condemned the next and executed on Tuesday or Wednesday". While Roth was not immediately tried and killed, possibly because he would have been acquitted of any charge the Elector could bring against him, he was imprisoned in a fortress in Peitz, Brandenburg, far away from Ducal Prussia. Initially, the terms of Roth's imprisonment were relatively benign and the Elector stated that he would free him if Roth would admit to treason. However, Roth refused to ask for pardon and secretly continued agitation against the Elector via clandestine letters sent from his prison cell. When these were discovered, the conditions in the prison were made worse and Frederick swore never to release him. At the end of his life, at the age of seventy, Roth did submit himself to the Elector, remained imprisoned and died two years later.

With the death of Count Christian Ludwig von Kalckstein in 1672, who had been kidnapped from Poland by Frederick William's agents and executed in Memel, and the end of resistance to the Elector in Königsberg in 1674, the opposition of the Prussian Estates to Hohenzollern absolutism in Ducal Prussia came to an end.
