= Theodor Gottlieb von Hippel the Younger =

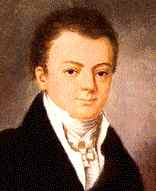

Theodor Gottlieb Hippel, from 1790 von Hippel (13 December 1775 in Gerdauen [now Zheleznodorozhny] – 10 June 1843 in Bromberg) was a Prussian statesman, the friend of E. T. A. Hoffmann, and the author of Frederick William III's proclamation An Mein Volk (1813). He belonged to the circle of Prussian reformers, and supported many liberal policies, including bilingual education in Silesia.

== Life ==
Hippel was the son of Gotthard Friedrich Hippel (1743–1809), a pastor, and Henriette Stogler (1750–1779). After his mother's death the boy was sent to the Burgschule at Königsberg, and remained in the care of his uncle, the satirist Theodor Gottlieb von Hippel the Elder. In 1790 the family was ennobled.

On finishing school, Hippel studied law at the Albertina in Königsberg. At the age of nineteen, he was Auskultator, at twenty an articled clerk (Referendar), and at twenty-four King's Counsel (Justizrat) at Marienwerder (Kwidzyn). In 1810 he became an employee of the State Chancellor Karl August von Hardenberg, and the next year joined the State Council, where he wrote the famous proclamation An Mein Volk, in which for the first time a Prussian monarch directly addressed his subjects to explain his policies.

In 1814 Hippel resigned from the ministry and returned to Marienwerder, where he was first vice-president and then president of the West Prussian administration of that city. In 1823 he became governor of Oppeln (Opole).

Hippel retired from public life in 1837 and donated a collection to the Königsberg Public Library. Having been obliged to sell his uncle's estate of Gut Leistenau two years earlier, he moved first to Berlin, and then to Bromberg (Bydgoszcz), where he died in 1843.

== Family ==
In 1798 Hippel married Jeanette Gruszczyńska (1783–1840). Their children were Theodor (1799–1881), Wilhelmina (1800–1835), Georg (1802–1878), who was to become a privy councillor at Gumbinnen (Gusev), and Jeanette (1804–1850).

== Friendship with E. T. A. Hoffmann ==
The young Hippel first met Hoffmann in 1786, at a country house at Arnau (near Königsberg). They both attended the Burgschule and both embarked on legal careers, although Hippel advanced much faster because of his rank. They corresponded frequently between 1794 and 1809, but then lost contact until 1814, when Hippel found Hoffmann work at the Supreme Court in Berlin. During the Meister Floh affair, Hippel used his influence to defend Hoffmann, and was a frequent visitor during his final illness. His memoir, Erinnerungen an Hoffmann, was published in 1822.

== Freemasonry ==
Hippel joined the Freemasons in 1797. His lodge was the Viktoria zu den drei gekrönten Türmen in Marienburg (Malbork). Hippel was one of the founders in 1803 of the lodge at Marienwerder, Zur goldenen Harfe, under the jurisdiction of the National Grand Lodge Zu den drei Weltkugeln (3WK) in Berlin. In 1815 he was elected Worshipful Master.
