= Burgschule (Königsberg) =

The Burgschule or Oberrealschule auf der Burg was a secondary school (Oberrealschule) located originally in central Königsberg, Germany, and later in the suburban Amalienau quarter. It was the fourth oldest school in the city, behind Altstadt Gymnasium, Kneiphof Gymnasium, and Löbenicht Realgymnasium.

== History ==
In 1658 a parochial school was founded in Burgfreiheit near Königsberg Castle to serve the city's reformed community, which included Germans, English, Scots, Poles, Lithuanians, and Huguenots. Its first and initially only teacher was Dr. Paul Andreas Jurski, who would later become a reformed pastor in Memel (Klaipėda). On 18 August 1664 Frederick William, Elector of Brandenburg, had the parochial school reorganized into a reformed Latin school. Frederick William donated 100 Hufen (roughly 750 hectares) near Labiau (Polessk) in support of the school. In 1691 his successor, Frederick, endowed the school and reformed community with an additional 20 Hufen near Spannegeln. Service was sometimes held in Polish in a private room within the school. A reformed church, the Burgkirche, was constructed near the Burgschule in the 1690s. The Huguenots later moved to their own church, the French Reformed Church, in the 1730s.

In 1720, the first Lutheran teacher was employed at the Burgschule, with more and more students and teachers following. Guided by Wilhelm Crichton (1732-1805), the school grew from 46 students in 1775 to 120 students in 1804. Ca. 1800, three quarters of its students were Lutheran rather than reformed. On 6 May 1813 it changed from a Latin school to a Bürgerschule, a type of vocational school, and was renamed the Höhere Burgschule. Until 1821, some curriculum was in English, Scottish, and Polish.

The Burgschule continued to flourish under the leadership of Karl Leopold Büttner (1787-1866), director from 1836 to 1856, and Heinrich Wilhelm Schifferdecker (1810–93), who was director until 1881. It became a first class Realschule on 15 October 1859 and a Realgymnasium (Realgymnasium auf der Burg) on 10 April 1882. The connection between the school and the Burgkirche ended on 1 April 1889, however. It was taken over by the state and gradually converted into an Oberrealschule (Oberrealschule auf der Burg) from Easter 1893 until 1902. It moved into the building formerly used by the Collegium Fridericianum at Kollegienplatz on 29 September 1895. The school consisted of 16 teachers and 383 students in 1901.

Later directors of the Burgschule included Karl Böttcher (1838-1900) from 1882 to 1900, Max Mirisch (1853-1912) from 1900 to 1912, and Friedrich Graz until 1924. From 1924 to 1936 it was directed by Richard Dräger, while the final directors were Bruno Zerull and Dr. Falcke.

In 1927 the Burgschule moved from Kollegienplatz in central Königsberg to Lehndorfstraße in Amalienau, part of the rapidly expanding Hufen suburbs. The new school was constructed from 1926 to 1927 and built in the style of a brick Ordensburg of the Teutonic Knights, Lochstedt Castle near Pillau (Baltiysk). Above the entrance were busts by Stanislaus Cauer of Nicolaus Copernicus, Immanuel Kant, Johann Gottfried Herder, and Lovis Corinth. Beginning in 1936, it was called "Oberschule für Jungen auf der Burg". On January 22, 1945, as the East Prussian Offensive began with the entrance of the Red Army into East Prussia, instruction at the school was halted, as it was in all the remaining schools in Königsberg. The building in Hufen is now used as a secondary school in Kaliningrad, Russia.

In 1955 Duisburg sponsored the Stadtgemeinde Königsberg of refugees from the city. On May 28, 1955, the Landfermann Gymnasium in Duisburg took over the sponsorship for the former Collegium Fridericianum. On the occasion of the 300th anniversary of its founding, the Mercator-Gymnasium in the same city took on sponsorship for the Burgschule on September 27, 1958.

== Notable people ==
=== Faculty ===
- Ottomar Cludius (1850-1910), philologist
- Richard Draeger (1876-1945), teacher from 1921 until 1936
- Christian Gottlieb Lorek (1788-1871), botanist
- Franz Olck (1841-1905), philologist, teacher from 1867 until 1894
- Heinrich Schiefferdecker (1810–1891), rector until 1881
- Ernst Wiechert (1887-1950), writer
- Albert Zweck (1857-1934), geographer

=== Students ===
- Colmar von der Goltz (1843-1916), field marshal
- Theodor Gottlieb von Hippel the Younger (1775-1843), statesman
- E. T. A. Hoffmann (1776-1822), writer and composer
- August Wilhelm Karl Graf von Konitz
- Daniel Thomas Matuszewski
- Gustav Adolf Miegel, father of Agnes Miegel
- Gustav Albert Peter
- Ernst Wiechert (1887-1950), writer

== Literature ==
- Reinhard Adam: Das Stadtgymnasium Altstadt-Kneiphof zu Königsberg (Pr.). 1304–1945. Aus der Geschichte der beiden ältesten Schulen des deutschen Ostens. Leer, Rautenberg 1977, ISBN 3-7921-0196-3.
- Albert Zweck: Die Geschichte der Burgschule 1664-1914. Königsberg 1914
