= Burgkirche, Königsberg =

Former protestant church in Königsberg, East Prussia (today's Kaliningrad, Russia)

Coordinates: 54°42′44″N 20°30′58″E

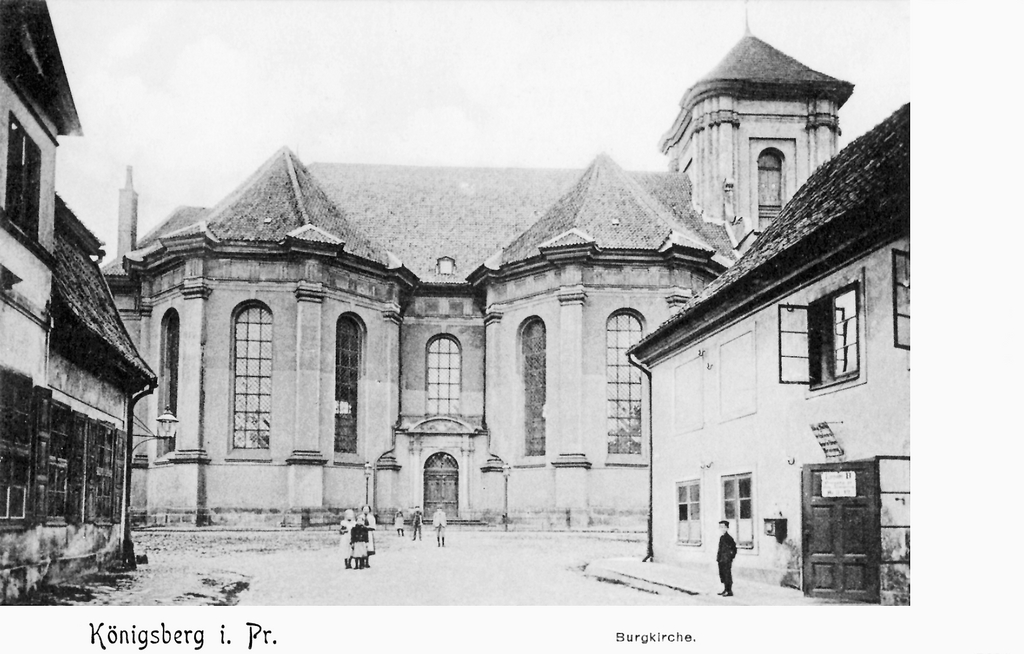
View of the Burgkirche from Französische Straße

The Burgkirche was a Reformed Protestant church of the Prussian Union in Königsberg, Prussia.

== History ==
After the conversion of the Hohenzollern elector John Sigismund of Brandenburg, also Duke of Prussia from 1612, the first Calvinist service was performed in 1616 by the Hessian court chaplain Johannes Crocius in a hall of Königsberg Castle. In 1662, the 'Great Elector' Frederick William ordered the building of a new Reformed church and Latin school in the Burgfreiheit quarter near the castle, granting land near a slaughterhouse. The transfer of land only occurred in 1665, however, and the initiative was halted until the 1680s.

In 1687, the court expanded the grounds for the church by purchasing a garden on the Schlossteich pond north of the former slaughterhouse from Oberburggraf Ahasverus von Lehndorff. The new Baroque church was built from 1690 to 1696; Johann Arnold Nering modeled it after the sober appearance of the Nieuwe Kerk in The Hague. It was dedicated in the presence of the new King in Prussia, Frederick I on 23 January 1701.

From 1706 to 1843 it was home to the city's Polish Reformed congregation.

By 1819, the reformed church was known simply as the Burgkirche (Castle Church).

Between 1817 and 1945, the congregation formed part of the Evangelical Church in Prussia, a church body comprising Reformed, Lutheran, and United Protestant congregations. The church was severely damaged by the 1944 Bombing of Königsberg in World War II and burnt out completely. The remnants were demolished by the Soviet administration in Kaliningrad in 1969.

== Interior ==
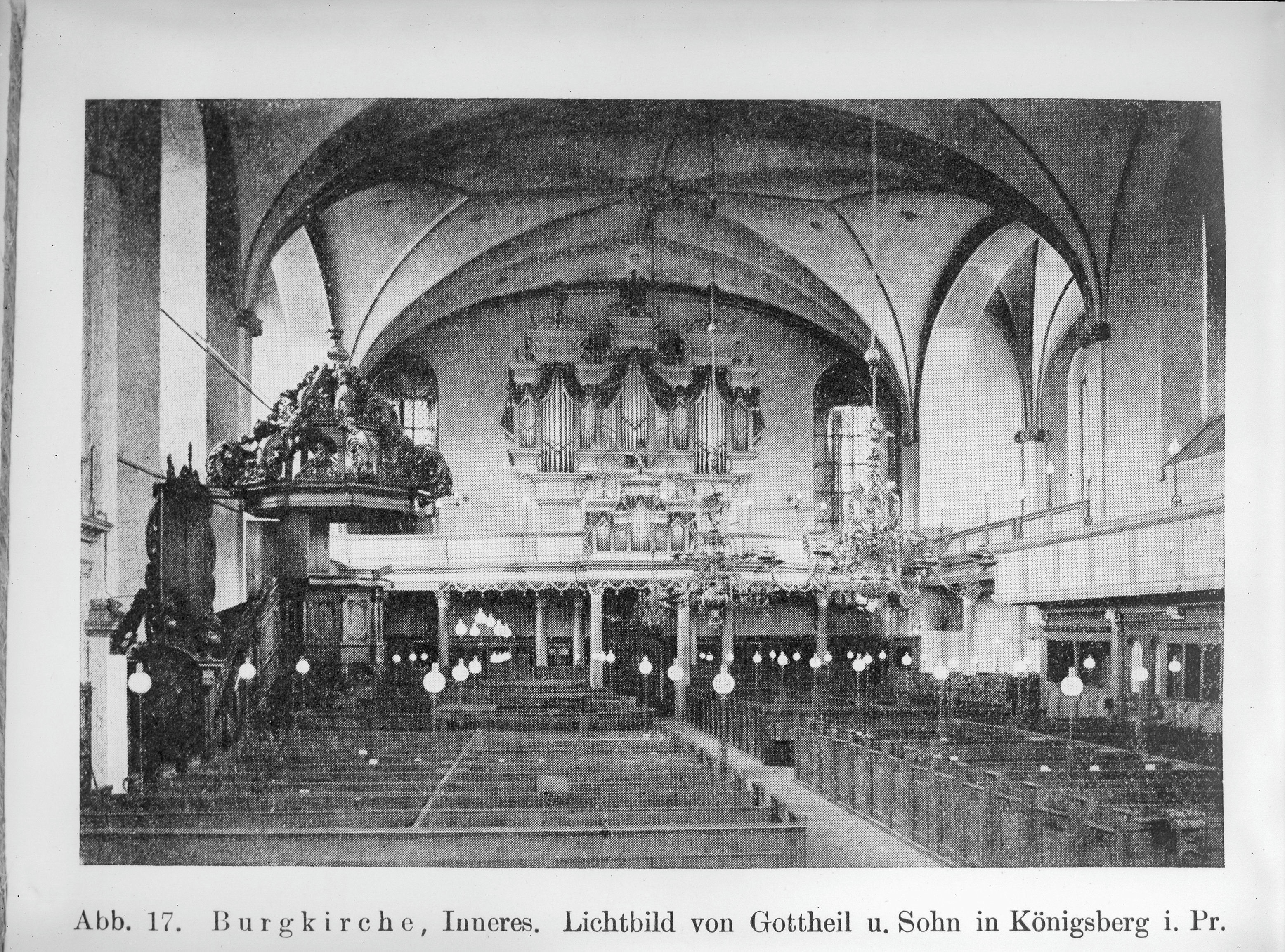
Interior

The wooden vault of the nave was covered with stucco, and only the apses had a stellar vault. The pulpit was on the long side of the nave covered with a crown. The organ was the work of Johann Josua Mosengel's assistant Georg Siegmund Caspari (1693–1741), who built the instrument as his “Probstück“ (=masterpiece) under Mosengel's supervision. It was, like many organs in Konigsberg, decorated with the Prussian eagle and is considered to be the last new built organ in the area of East Prussia, which was equipped with a choir organ. Commissioned by commerce official Charles Cabrit, the church's portal was designed in 1727 with allegorical sandstone figures of justice, love and, charity.
