= Schlosskirche, Königsberg =

Protestant church within Königsberg Castle

Schlosskirche
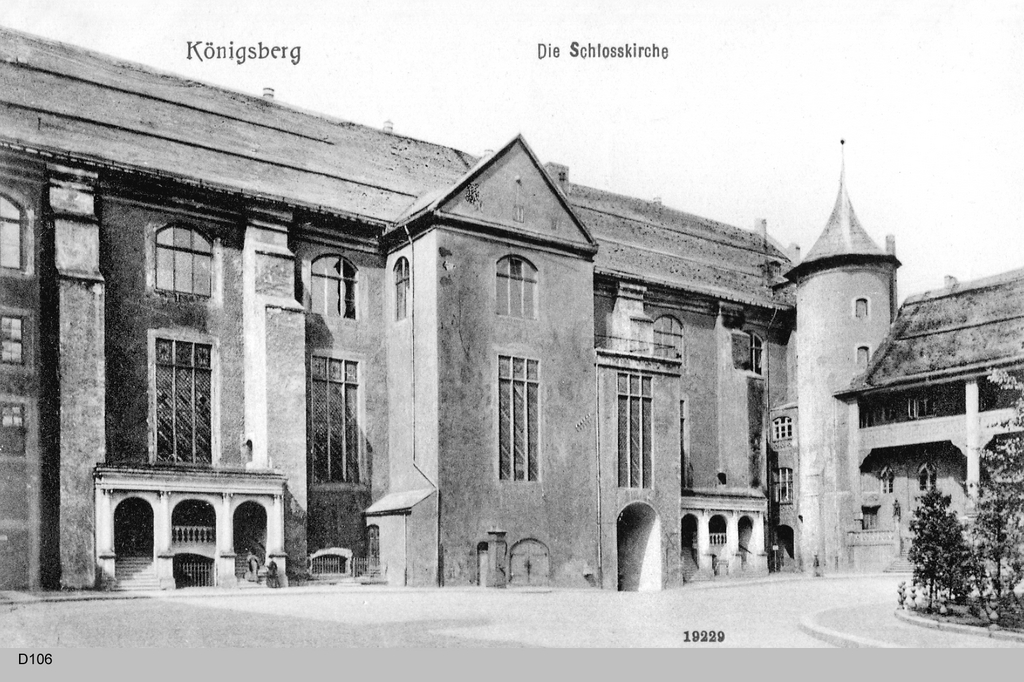
- Schlosskirche
- 54.7102°N 20.5108°E
- Location: Second floor, Königsberg Castle, Königsberg
- Denomination: Lutheran

History
- Founded: 1585
- Founder: Blasius Berwart of Stuttgart
- Dedicated: 1594
- Events: 18 January 1701 Coronation of Frederick I of Prussia; 18 October 1861 Coronation of William I

Architecture
- Demolished: 1968

The Schlosskirche or Schloßkirche (German for "castle church" or "palace church") was a Protestant church within Königsberg Castle in Königsberg (modern Kaliningrad, Russia).

== History ==
Construction of the Lutheran chapel along the western side of the castle's southern wing began in 1584 under the direction of Blasius Berwart of Stuttgart. Located on the second floor, the single-naved church featured a hall with wooden vaults, stucco, and Dutch-influenced scrollwork. The massive Moskowitersaal (Muscovite Hall) spanned the floor above. In 1594, the church was dedicated by Sebastian Artomedes, pastor of Königsberg Cathedral. Wood rot was discovered in the cellar, however, and from 1602 to 1608, the original wooden base was replaced with a doubly reinforced lierne or stellar vaulting with granite pillars by Hans Wissmar and Timotheus Just, building master of Elbląg. After the renovations were completed the now double-naved church contained slim granite pillars and a stellar vault. The first Calvinist sermons in the now double-naved church were held in 1641. In 1655, the city's first Polish Reformed Church services were held in the castle church, later moved to the Reformed school.

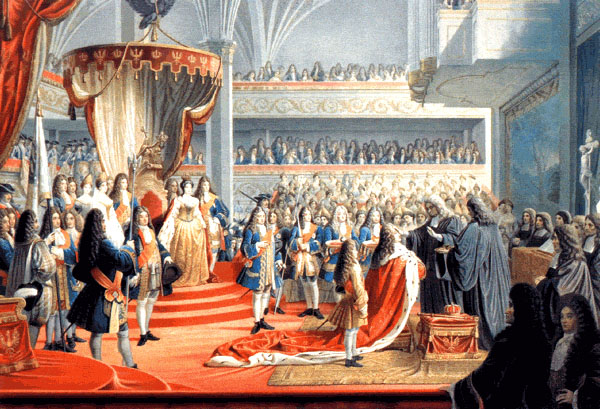
Anointing of King Frederick I

On 17 January 1701, Elector Frederick III founded the Order of the Black Eagle. The following day he crowned himself Frederick I, King in Prussia, in the castle's Albrechtsbau wing, followed by his anointing in the Schlosskirche. The church was decorated in gold and scarlet cloth, two thrones were placed before the altar, and the Swiss Guards and court officials were finely attired. Benjamin Ursinus von Bär represented the Calvinist clergy while Bernhard von Sanden represented the Lutherans. Approximately 4,000 guests were in attendance for the anointing. From 1705 to 1710 Joachim Ludwig Schultheiß von Unfriedt decorated the church with galleries, a royal box, and high altar.

An obsequy for Queen Louise of Prussia was held at the church on 11 September 1810. Oberbürgermeister August Wilhelm Heidemann gave the eulogy, Mozart's Requiem and Handel's Messiah were performed, and 2,500 candles were burned. In 1816 the Schlosskirche also began serving as a garrison church (Garnisonkirche).

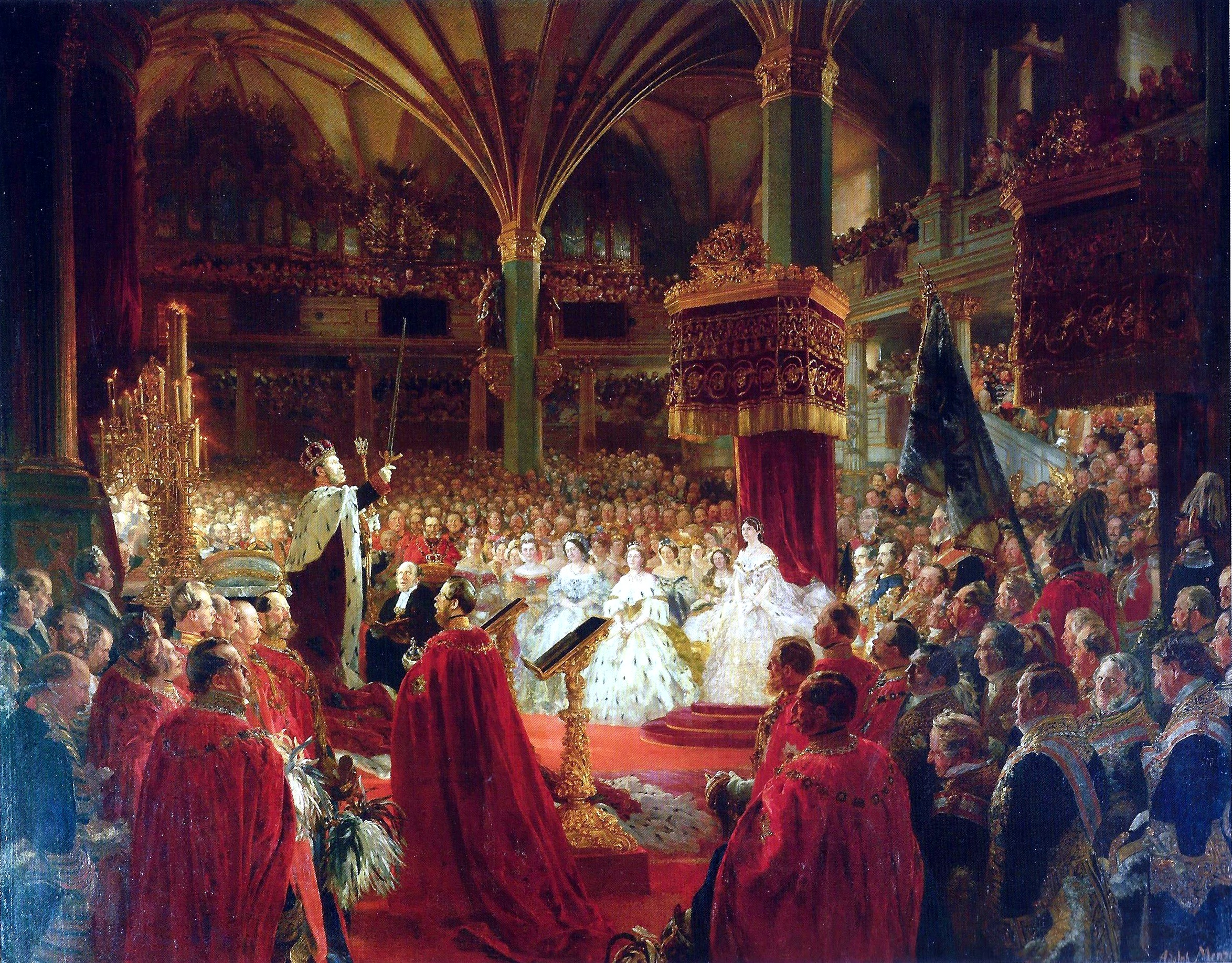
Coronation of King William I by Adolph Menzel

On 18 October 1861 William I crowned himself king within the church, the first Prussian king to do so in Königsberg since Frederick I. A coronation march written specifically by Giacomo Meyerbeer to commemorate the occasion was performed in the Moskowitersaal. Wilhelm Taubert replaced the ill Meyerbeer in directing a celebratory concert by the Hofkapelle.

As part of Königsberg Castle, the Schlosskirche was devastated by the 1944 Bombing of Königsberg and 1945 Battle of Königsberg during World War II. The remnants were demolished in 1968, by which time the city was known as Kaliningrad.

== Decoration ==
Alexander Krause designed images of Fides, Spes, Caritas, and Justitia on the pillars' ornamental consoles in 1606. The stellar vault contained stucco by Hans Windrauch from 1589, while the ceiling stucco was by Matthias Poertzel from 1706 to 1708. The church's Baroque high altar, one of the first in East Prussia, was decorated with wooden sculptures, possibly by Poertzel in 1710. The organ was designed by G. H. Trost and Adam Gottlob Casparini in 1732. The church was also decorated with the arms of the Order of the Black Eagle.

== Gallery ==
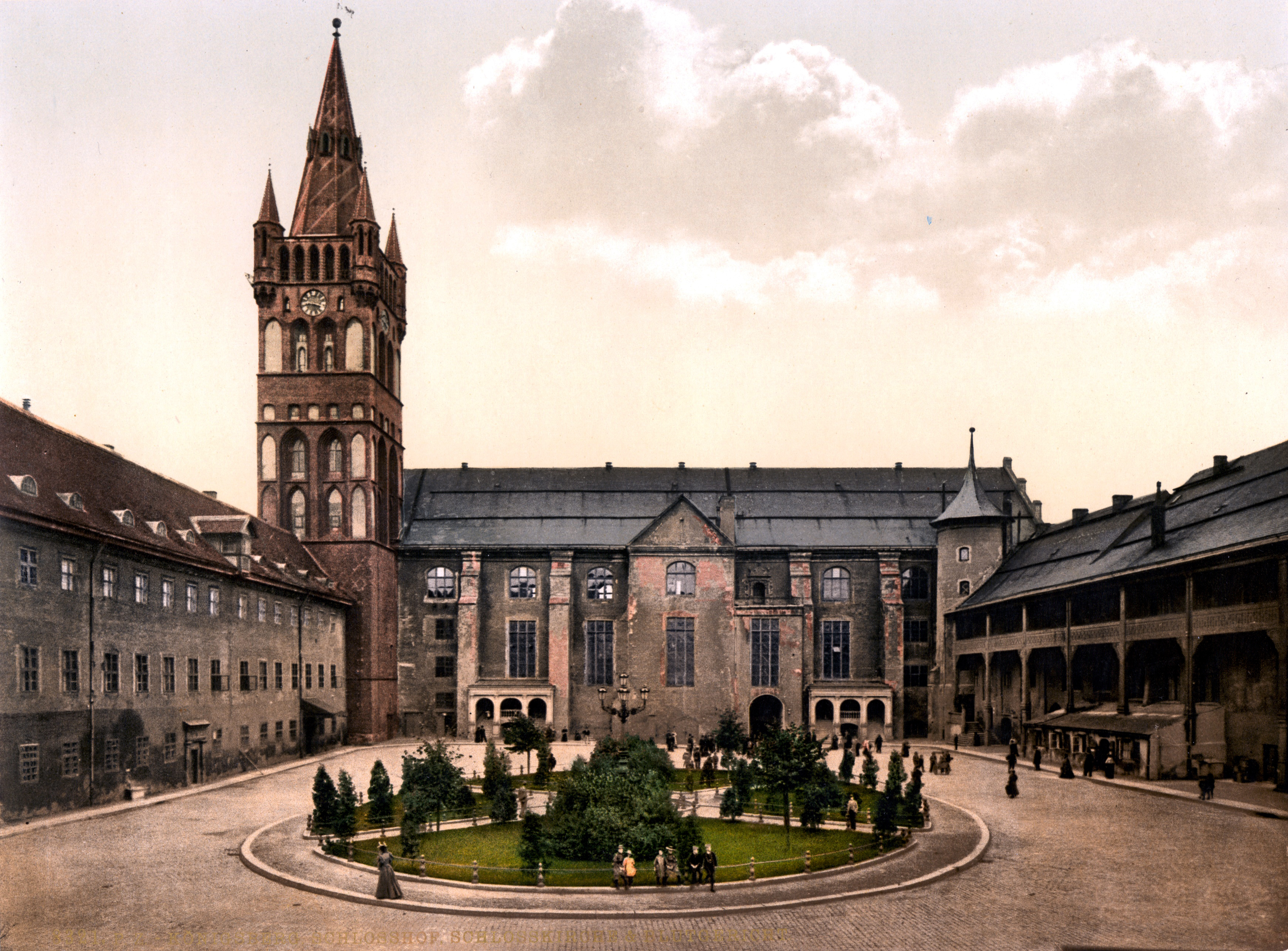
Courtyard of Königsberg Castle with the Schlosskirche

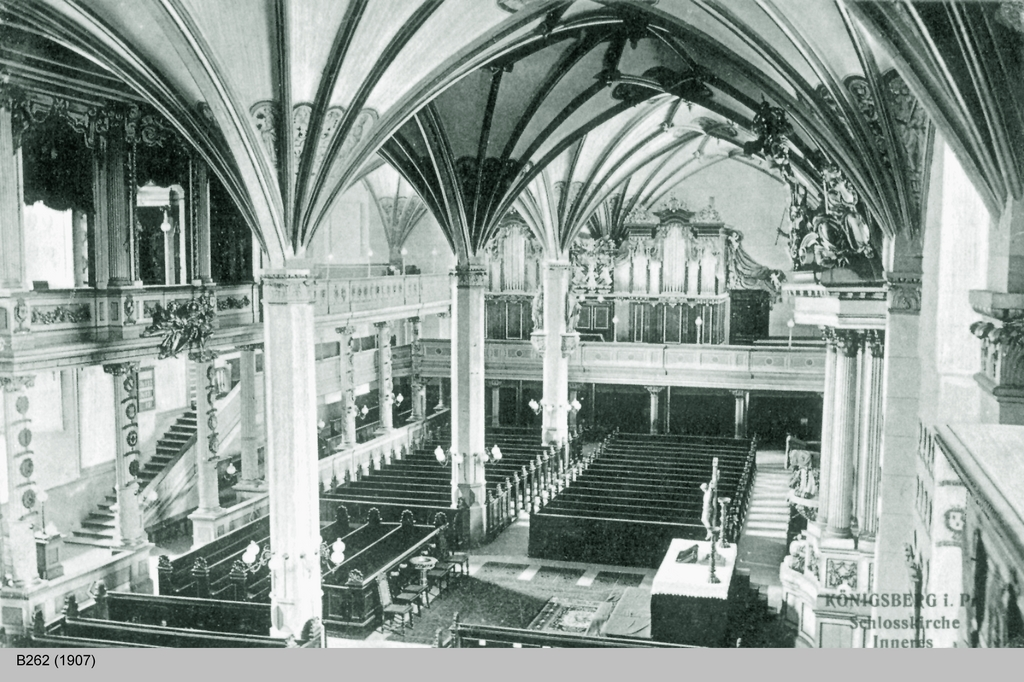
Church interior

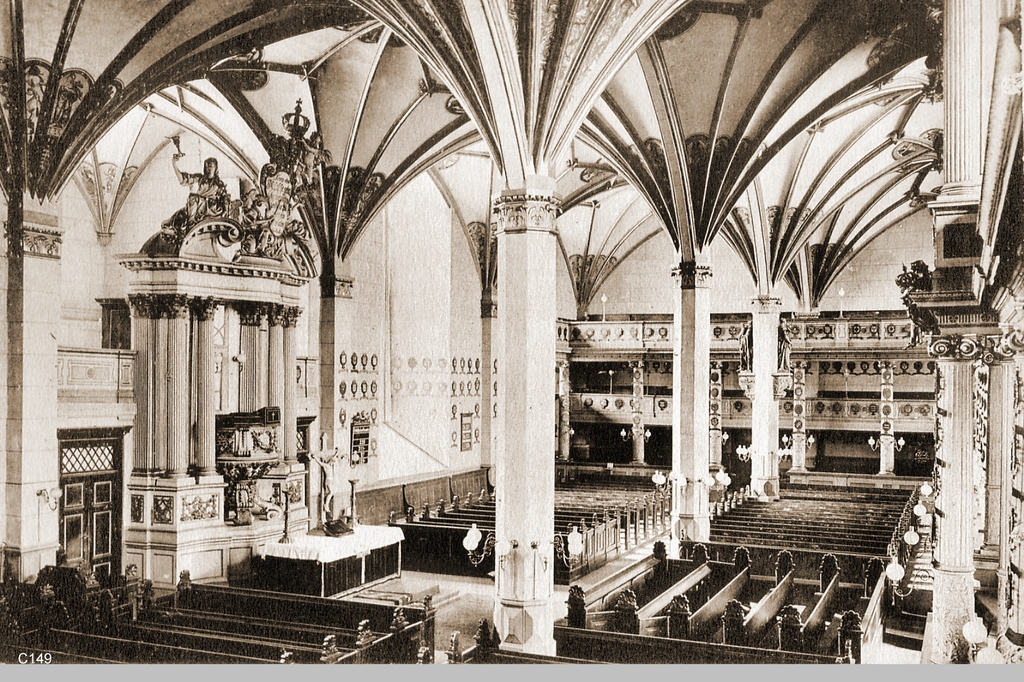
Church interior

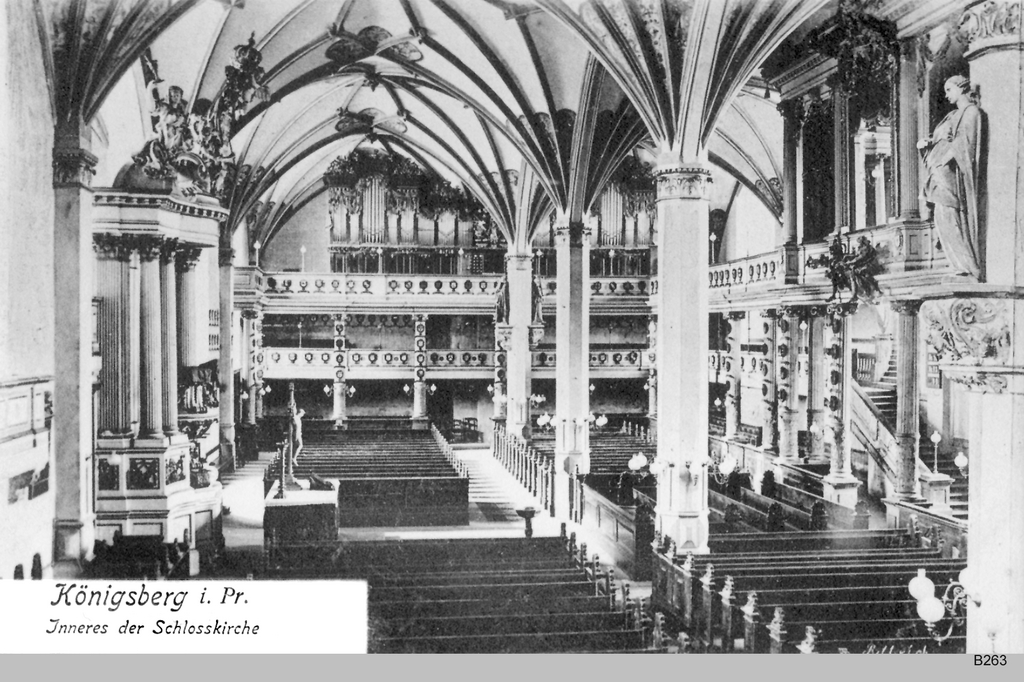
Church interior
