= French Reformed Church, Königsberg =

Church

Coordinates: 54°42′43″N 20°31′17″E

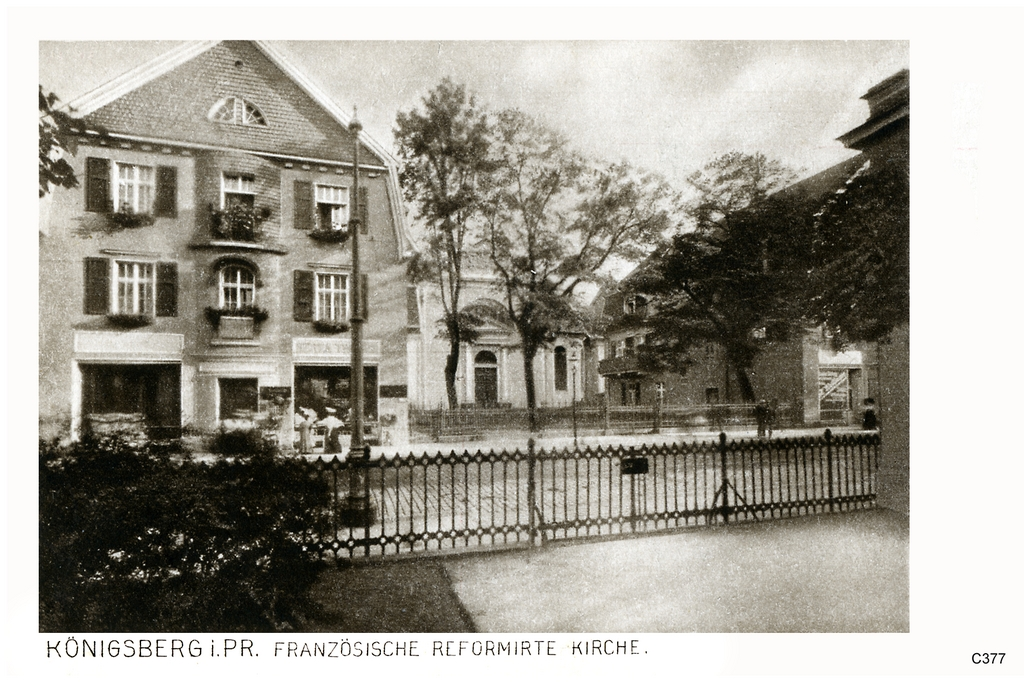
French Reformed Church

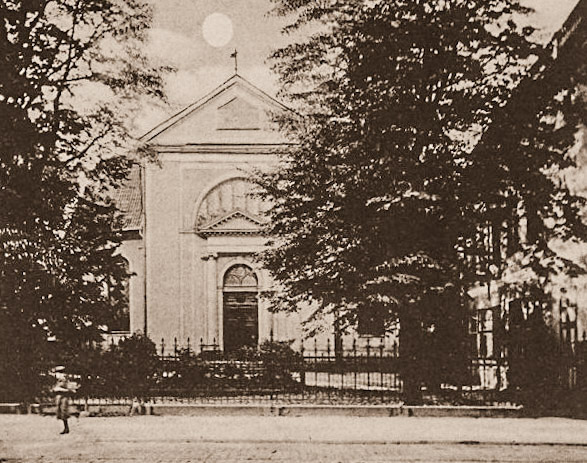
French Reformed Church

The French Reformed Church (German: Französisch-reformierte Kirche) was a Protestant church in eastern Königsberg, Germany.

== History ==
Located at the corner of Königstraße and Landhofmeister-Straße in Neue Sorge, the Rococo building served the Huguenot community of the city with French sermons. It was built from 1733 to 1736 according to plans by Joachim Ludwig Schultheiß von Unfriedt. King Frederick William I of Prussia, a Calvinist, provided 12,000 Thaler out of the total cost of 18,687. The new church was dedicated on 29 July 1736 in the presence of the king.

During negotiations for the Treaty of Tilsit in 1807, Pastor La Canal of the church and Königsberg Commerce Councilor Prin convinced Napoleon to reduce Prussia's war indemnity from 20 million to 12 million francs.

Beginning in 1817, German sermons were given every fourth week; by 1831, the pattern was reversed and French sermons were given every fourth week. The parish was fluent in German, but adhered to its Huguenot past out of tradition. Pastor Louise Guillaume Daniel Detroit denounced the Athanasian Creed in 1847, leading to his removal in 1852.

The French Reformed Church was heavily damaged by the 1944 Bombing of Königsberg and 1945 Battle of Königsberg. Its ruins in Kaliningrad were demolished from 1967 to 1968.

== Design ==
Built as an elongated decagon, the church had a lighter and graceful look. The square central space was surrounded by elliptical side aisles supported by columns. The wooden pulpit dated from 1737, while the tassel-decorated organ was made in 1739.

The central archive in Berlin of the Evangelical Church in Germany contains artifacts from the church, including a gilded silver goblet (1690 by Paul Müller), a copy of the goblet (1749 by Cornelius Muerkerk), and a gilded ciborium of silver (1699 by Paul Müller).
