= History of Poles in Königsberg =

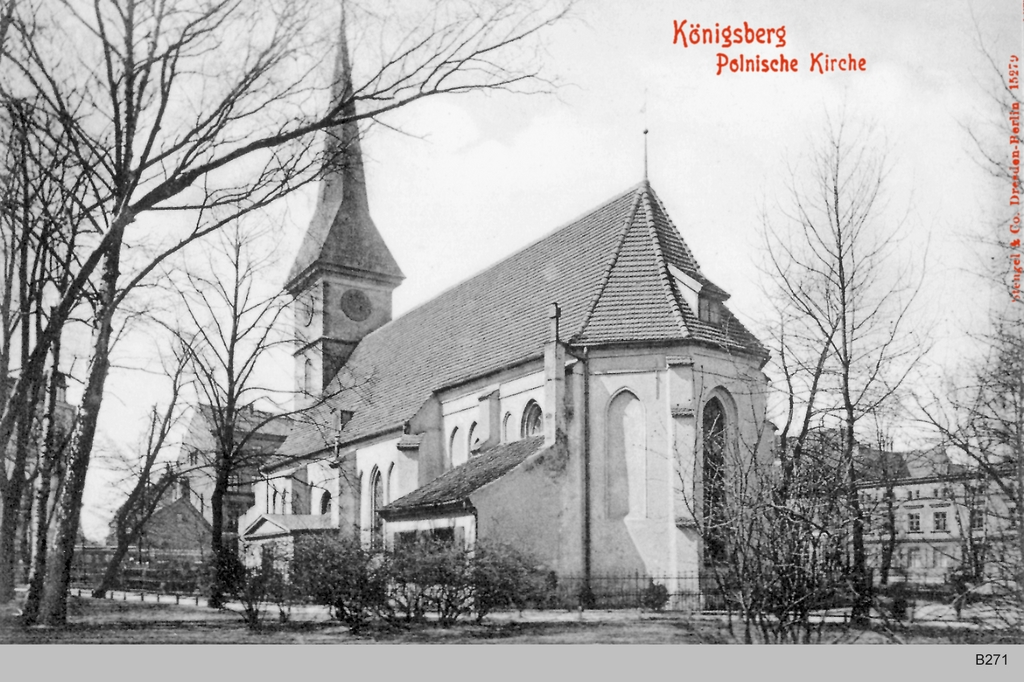
The Polish church in Steindamm was the oldest church of Konigsberg.

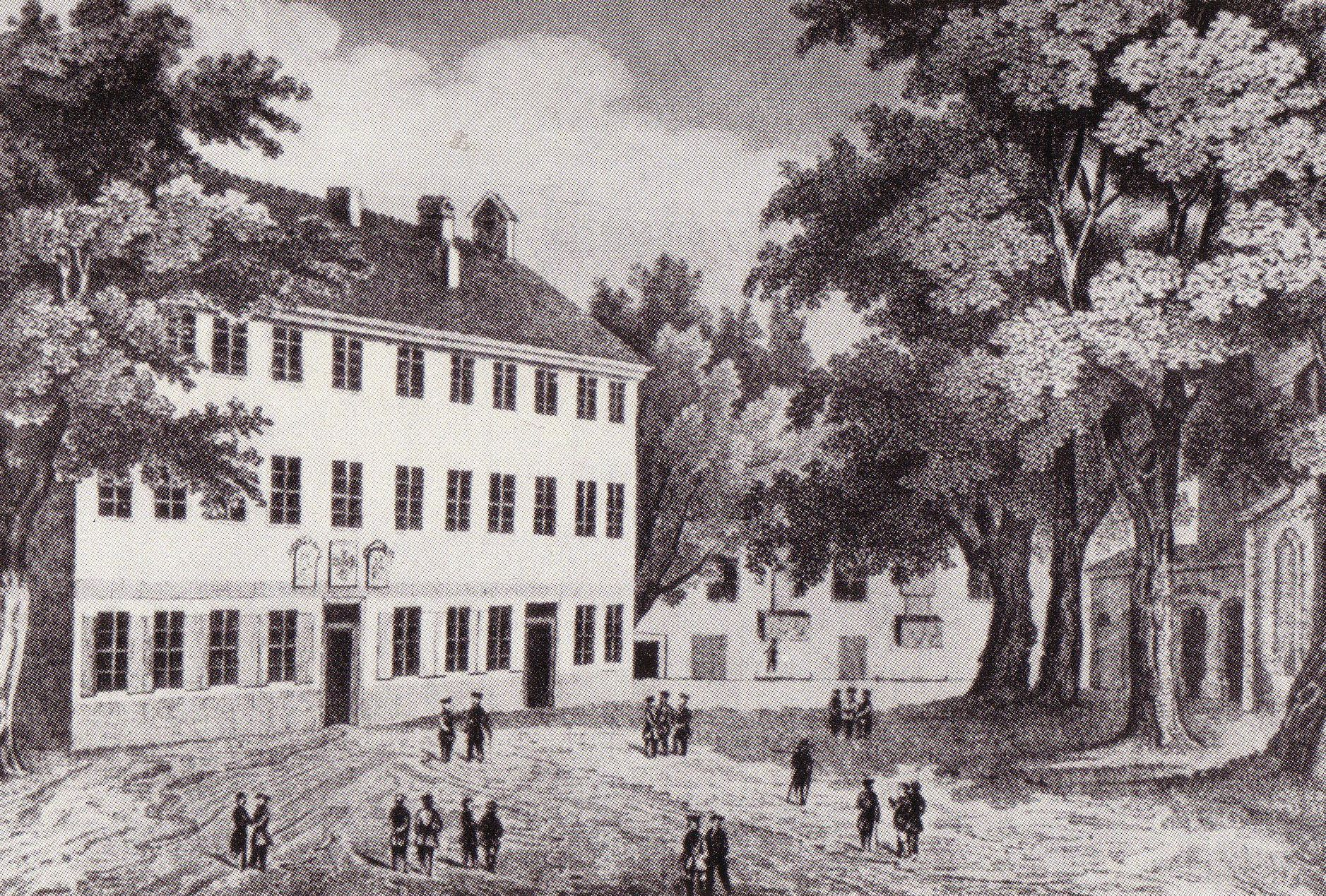
The University of Königsberg was considered one of the most prestigious universities of the Polish–Lithuanian Commonwealth. It received the royal privilege by Polish King Sigismund II Augustus on 28 March 1560.

The history of Poles in Königsberg (Polish: Królewiec) goes back to the 14th century. In the struggles between the Kingdom of Poland and the Teutonic Order, the city was briefly part of the Polish state, and after the Second Peace of Toruń, 1466, it was considered a part of Poland as a fief held by the Teutonic Order and the secular Duchy of Prussia, as the capital of both entities. During the Protestant Reformation Königsberg became the center of Polish Lutheranism and partially for this reason, a birthplace of Polish printing and one of the epicenters of vernacular Polish literature. Polish intellectuals and scholars played a major role in the founding of the University of Königsberg (Albertina) and served as both faculty and administrators. At peak, in the 17th-19th centuries, Polish church services were held during the same period in six churches: four Lutheran, one Catholic, and one Reformed.

Over the course of the 19th century the Polish population in Königsberg declined, due to assimilation and Germanization, although the publication of Polish language works in the city continued until 1931.

== Background ==
In 1255 the Teutonic Knights, during the Prussian Crusade, captured the Baltic Prussian fortress of Tuwangste on the Pregel (Pregola) river. On its site they expanded the existing fortifications into what later became known as the Königsberg Castle. The new fort was named in honor of king Ottokar II of Bohemia (König is the German word for king). Subsequently, towards the end of the thirteenth century, the towns of Altstadt (Old Town, Stare Miasto), Löbenicht (Lipnik) and Kneiphof (Knipawa) arose around the castle and these would eventually together form the town of Konigsberg. The initial settlements were populated mostly by immigrants from the Hanseatic city of Lübeck (Liubice) as well as local Sambian converts to Christianity. They were served by the newly built St. Michael's Church in what later would become known as the Steindamm (Polish: Kamienna Grobla, literally: "stone dam", "stone levee") neighborhood. Although the church, along with a good portion of the town, was destroyed during the Great Prussian Uprising (1260-1274), it was rebuilt during the first half of the fourteenth century and eventually came to play an important role in the Polish cultural life of the city.

== Polish name of the city ==
The first recorded name of the castle is castrum de Coningsberg in Zambia. The Polish chronicler Jan Długosz, writing in the 15th century referred to the city's battle standard captured by the Poles at the Battle of Grunwald (1410) by both the German name Kunigsperk and the Polish version Crolowgrod, which given the Polish orthography of the time, has been transliterated as Krolowgrod. Król is the Polish word for king and gród is similar to the German ending "berg". Krolowgrod by the 16th century became the standard Polish name Królewiec.

== Polish settlement in the city up to the Protestant Reformation ==
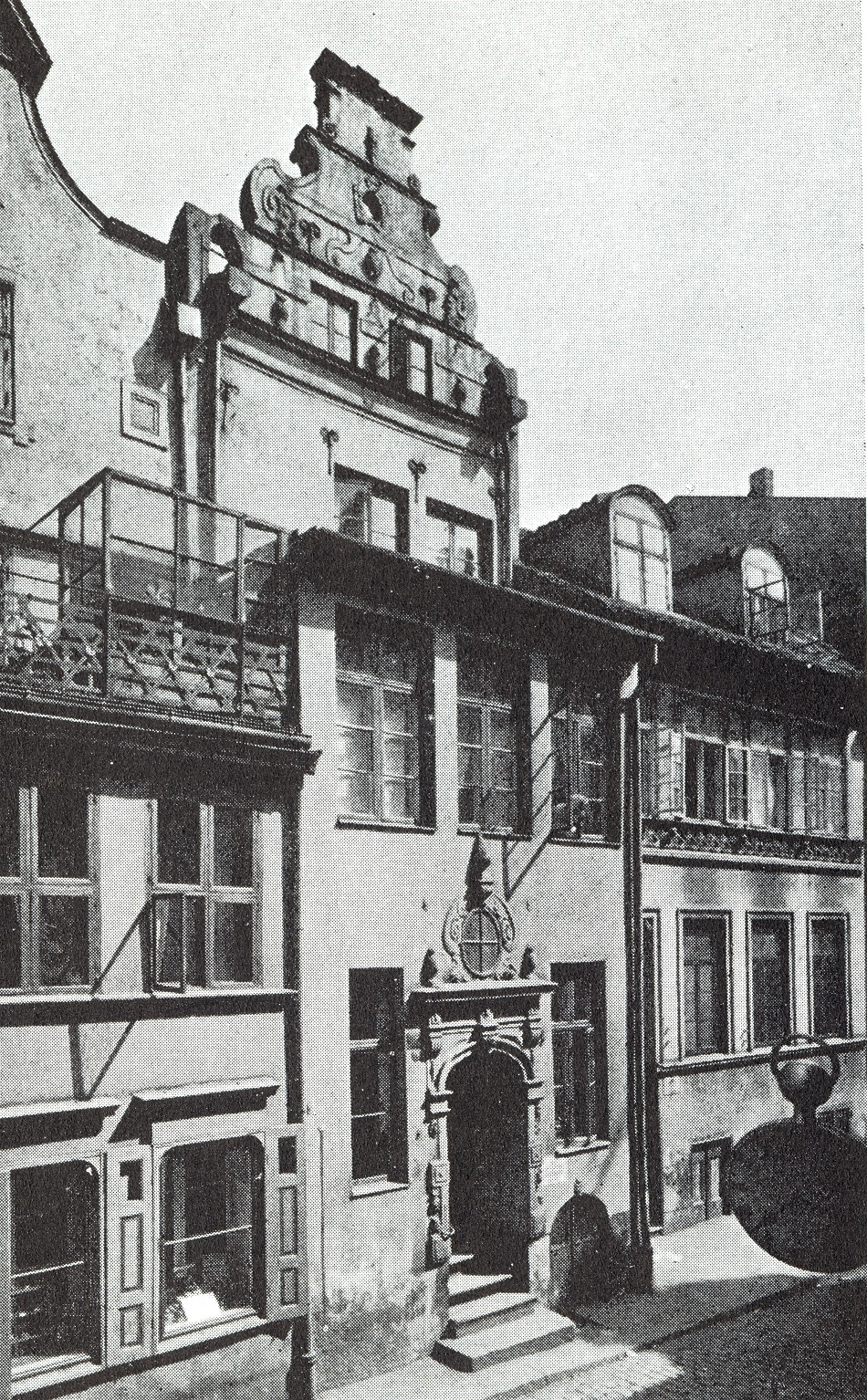
Polnische Gasse in c. 1897

Polish migrants from Masuria began moving to Königsberg during the fourteenth century, settling particularly in the Knipawa portion of the town, and, along with Lithuanians and Kurlandians, were soon granted the ability to acquire burgher rights. Unlike the local Old Prussians, Poles along with Germans, were allowed membership in the local trade guilds. By the beginning of the fifteenth century, according to the German historian Bernhard Stade, a large portion of the city's population was fluent in Polish, mostly for economic reasons.

By 1436 one of the largest streets in the city was named Polnische Gasse (Polish Street) and a tower near the Cathedral bridge was referred to as Polnische Turm (Polish Tower). Until the first half of the sixteenth century however, most of the Polish inhabitants were part of the lower, poorer, class of the city. This began to change, particularly with the Protestant Reformation, so that by the 1520s Polish individuals show up among master artisans and intellectuals.

According to historian Janusz Jasiński, based on estimates obtained from the records of St. Michael's Church, during the 1530s Lutheran Poles constituted about one quarter of the city population. This does not include Polish Catholics or Calvinists who did not have centralized places of worship until the seventeenth century, hence records that far back for these two groups are not available.

== Political connections with Poland ==
While Königsberg began as a fortress of the Teutonic Knights, the growing town soon found itself in conflict with the Order. The main cause of the discontent were the economic policies of the Knights which were perceived as detrimental to trade and growth, although ethnic and national identity also played a role. Specifically, the German Knights came to be perceived to be an outside force, ruling over a newly developed, organic Prussian identity which emerged from the merger of native elements - Poles, Old Prussians and Pomeranians - and migrants to the region.

In the Battle of Grunwald of 1410, the banners of the Königsberg Commandery and the Old Town were taken by the Poles and displayed in the Wawel Cathedral. In the case of a complete Polish-Lithuanian victory, King Władysław II Jagiełło planned to incorporate the city into Lithuania, rather than Poland, within the Polish-Lithuanian union. During the Polish–Teutonic War of 1414, as the Polish-Lithuanian army was only a dozen or so kilometers from the city, houses in Löbenicht (Lipnik) began to be demolished to secure the Old Town.

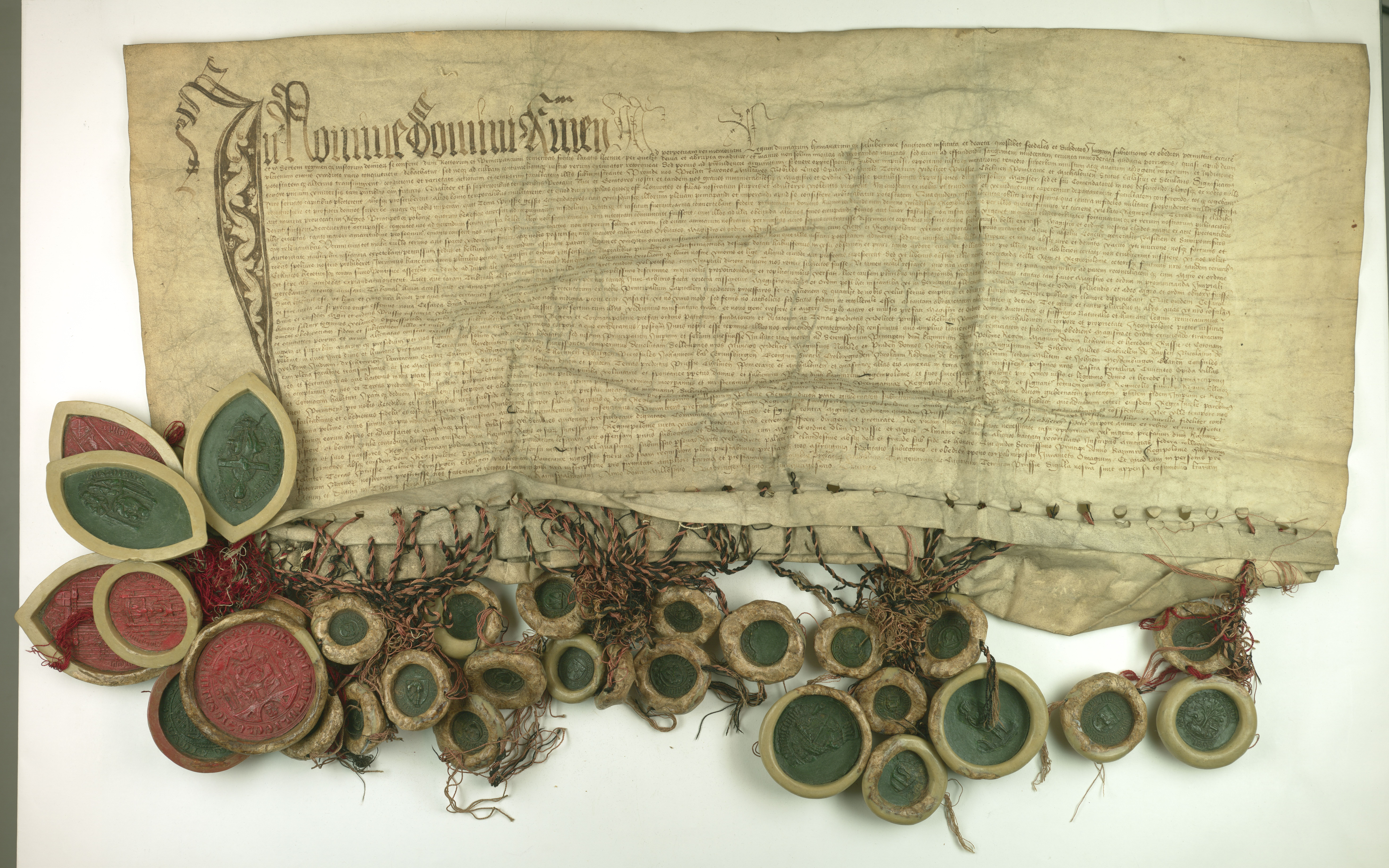
Prussian Confederation offered to incorporate Prussia into the Crown of the Kingdom of Poland, 1454, Central Archives of Historical Records, Warsaw

The tensions led Königsberg to co-establish the Prussian Confederation, formed in Kwidzyn in 1440, which opposed the Teutonic Order and sought help and protection from Poland. On February 4, 1454, the Secret Committee of the Prussian Confederation, representing the cities, towns and nobility in the Teutonic State, repudiated their allegiance to the Knights, and asked King of Poland Casimir IV Jagiellon to incorporate the region, incl. Königsberg, to the Kingdom of Poland. The Teutonic Order's garrison in Königsberg Castle surrendered to the city's burghers. Casimir IV Jagiellon affirmed the Confederation's plea for protection and on March 6 issued an edict in Kraków which officially incorporated Königsberg, as well as other parts of Prussia, into the Polish Kingdom. The local mayor pledged allegiance to the Polish King during the incorporation in Kraków. King Casimir IV authorized the city to mint Polish coins, and abolished the Pfundzoll, one of the taxes imposed by the Teutonic Knights in order to finance their wars against Poland and Lithuania. The city, known in Polish as Królewiec, became the seat of the short-lived Królewiec Voivodeship and Casimir IV named Ścibor Bażynski as the first wojewoda (Polish governor) of the province. The official act of incorporation was signed on April 15, signed by representatives of Knipawa and Old Town. This marked the beginning of the Thirteen Years' War (1454–1466) between Poland and the Prussian cities on one side, and the Teutonic Knights on the other. On June 19, 1454, a public ceremony was held in the city, during which the mayors of the Old Town, Knipawa and Lipnik, officially recognized Polish rule and paid homage to Poland.

However, after the Polish defeat at Battle of Chojnice in September 1454, attitudes in parts of the city began to change and in 1455 Old Town and Lipnik rebelled against the pro-Polish factions and repudiated the agreement, with Knipawa remaining as the only portion of the town loyal to the Polish crown. In 1465, there was another anti-Teutonic rebellion in the city, but it was suppressed and six townspeople were executed.

In the last phase of the war, the Order began running out of finances, and after a string of victories by the Polish commander Piotr Dunin agreed to the Second Peace of Toruń (1466). In 1466, the city pressed for the Teutonic Knights to accept Polish peace terms, and the mayors of the Old Town and Knipawa took part in the peace negotiations. The seals of all three towns were attached to the documents of the peace treaty. As a result, the part of the Knight's state was reincorporated into Poland as the province of Royal (or "Polish") Prussia, while the eastern portion also became a part of "one and indivisible" Kingdom of Poland, as a fief held by the Teutonic Order (until 1525), and by secular Ducal Prussia afterwards, until 1657, with Königsberg (Królewiec) as the capital.

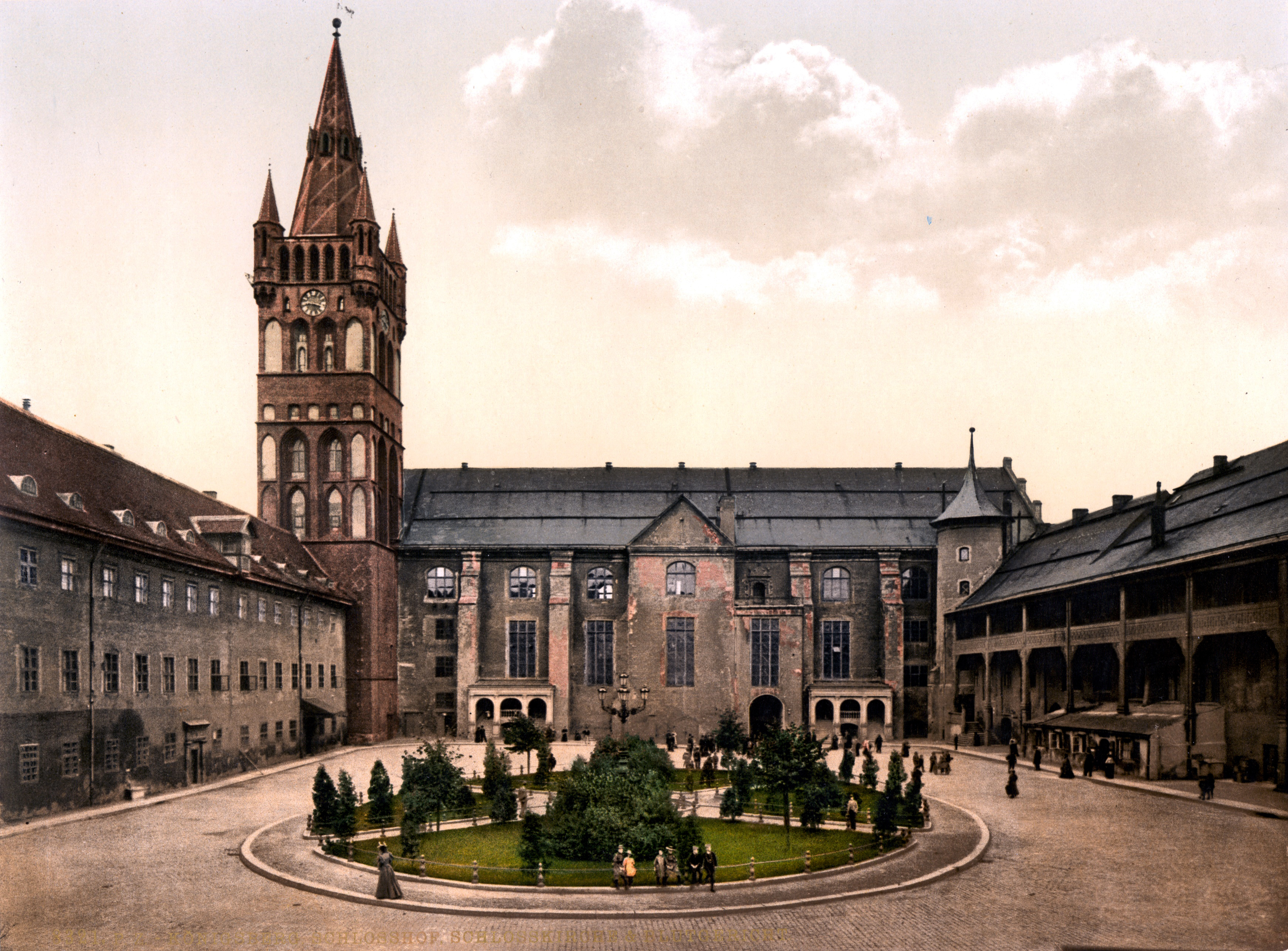
Königsberg Castle served as a residence of Polish Kings Władysław IV Vasa (in 1635) and Stanisław Leszczyński (in 1734–1736)

In 1478, the city came into conflict with Grand Master of the Teutonic Order Martin Truchseß von Wetzhausen, who wanted to cut ties with Poland, and pressured him to pay homage to King Casimir IV Jagiellon. On several occasions the city got into disputes with the Prussian Dukes and sought intervention and confirmation of its rights from the Polish authorities. Polish Kings Sigismund II Augustus in 1552, Sigismund III Vasa in 1589 were hosted by the city very grandly. In 1566, the city's rights were extended and the Prussian dukes were not allowed to interfere in the city's internal affairs by the Polish Royal Commissioners. In 1635, Polish King Władysław IV Vasa granted the city the right to organize its military defense against a possible Swedish attack in exchange for exemption from paying taxes to Prussian dukes. King Władysław IV was hosted in the city very grandly during his visits in 1635 and 1636. He appointed Jerzy Ossoliński as the Polish governor of the duchy in 1636. Ossoliński resided in the city and completed the fortification of the city against a potential Swedish attack.

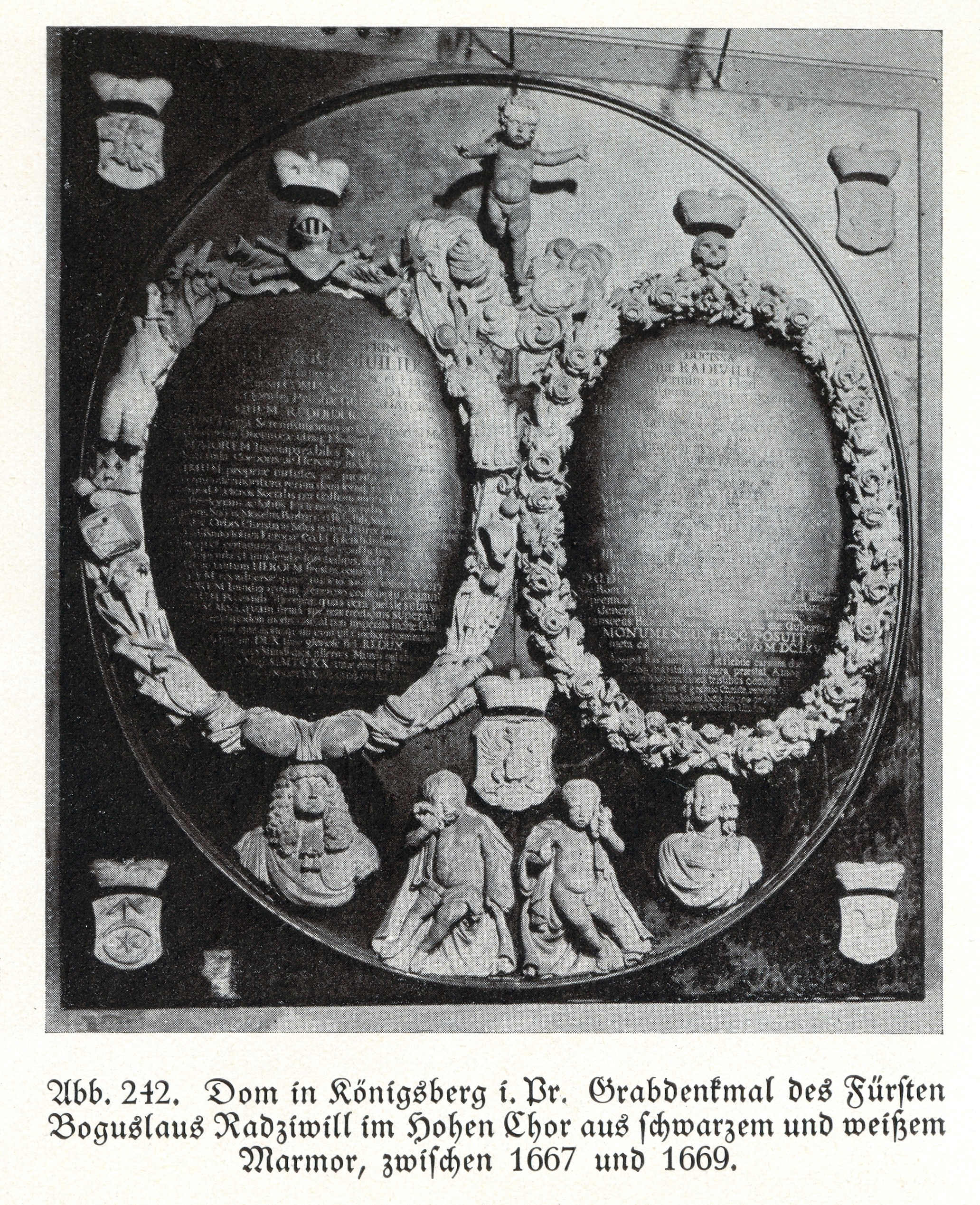
Marble epitaph of Bogusław Radziwiłł in Königsberg Cathedral

After Sweden's invasion of Poland in 1655, the city willingly passed new taxes to finance the fight against the invaders. Frederick William's support for Sweden against Poland was met with opposition from the city, which stopped paying taxes and demanded the expulsion of the Brandenburg troops. Since 1657, the city strongly opposed the rule of Elector Frederick William, and opted to remain part of the Kingdom of Poland. In 1662, the city sent a letter to the Polish King John II Casimir Vasa opposing the rule of Elector Frederick William, and a confederation was formed in the city to maintain Poland's sovereignty over the city and region. The Elector and his army, however, entered the city and abducted and imprisoned the leader of the city's anti-Elector opposition Hieronymus Roth. In 1663, the city burghers, forced by Frederick William, swore an oath of allegiance to him, however, in the same ceremony they still also pledged allegiance to Poland.

During the Swedish invasion of Poland of 1701–1706, the city became a refuge for several Polish bishops, senators, nobles, and Jesuits from Braniewo.

From 1734, during the War of the Polish Succession, Polish King Stanisław Leszczyński stayed in the city, and several prominent Polish officials, including Franciszek Maksymilian Ossoliński, and voivodes Antoni Michał Potocki, Piotr Jan Czapski and Andrzej Morsztyn, formed an informal political committee in support of Leszczyński there in 1734. After the arrival of more Leszczyński's supporters in 1735, the city was the main center of authority and court of King Stanisław Leszczyński. After his defeat in the war, Leszczyński signed an act of renunciation of the Polish crown in the city on January 26, 1736, and then left the city for France on March 27, 1736.

In the 1750s, an unusual opportunity potentially arose for the city to return to Poland. In 1756 Russia decided to go to war with the Kingdom of Prussia and annex the territory and city, which was then to be offered to Poland as part of a territorial exchange desired by Russia, however, ultimately Russia only occupied the city for four years during the Seven Years' War before withdrawing in 1762 and did not make Poland an offer of territorial exchange.

== Center of Polish Lutheranism and printing ==
Examples of Polish Protestant old prints

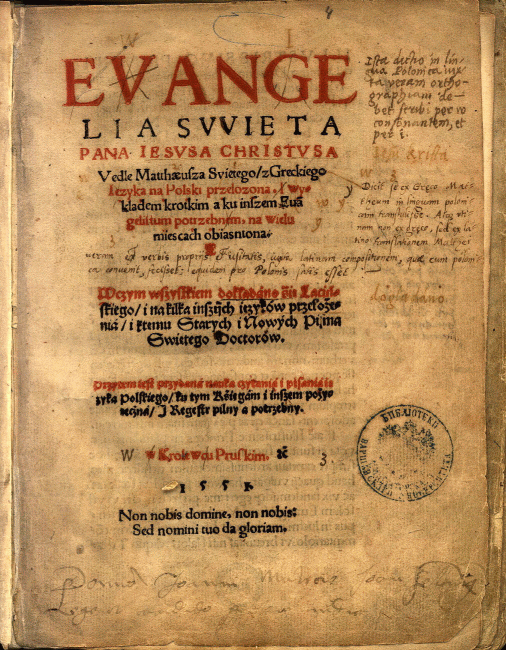
Gospel of Matthew translated by Jan Seklucjan and Stanisław Murzynowski, 1551

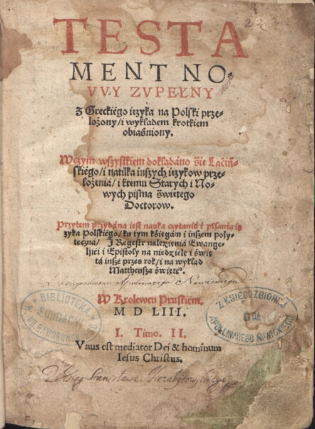
First Polish translation of the New Testament, by Stanisław Murzynowski, 1553

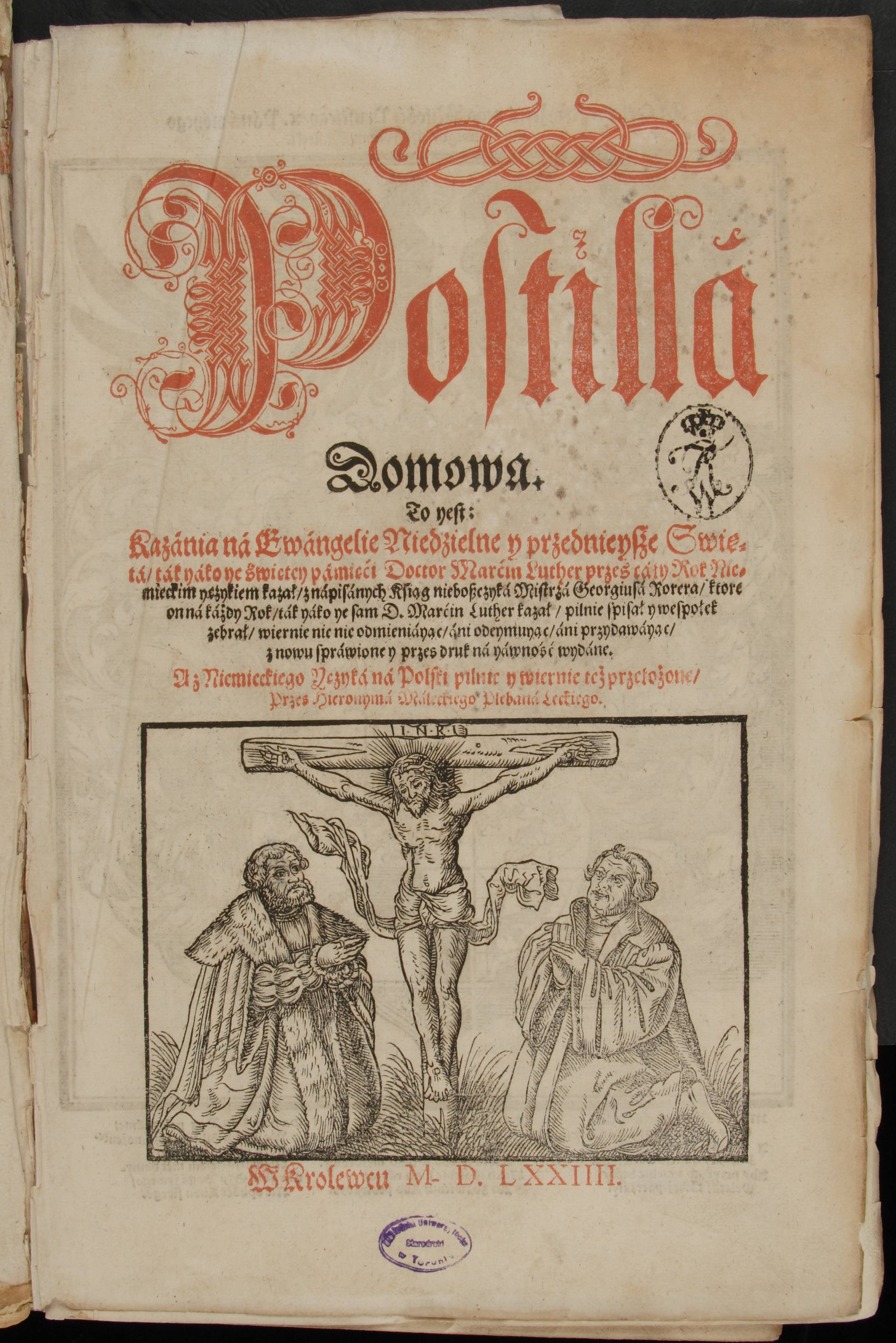
Polish translation of Martin Luther's postil by Hieronim Malecki, 1574

In 1519 another war between the Teutonic Order and Poland erupted. The city itself opposed the Teutonic Knights' war against Poland and demanded peace. A truce was signed in 1521, set to expire in 1525. Over the course of the next four years, the Grand Master of the Teutonic Order, Albert Hohenzollern in search for a political way out before the war resumed, met with several Lutheran theologians, including Andreas Osiander and Luther himself. Luther recommended that Albert convert to Lutheranism and secularize his duchy. By 1523 Albert began promoting the new faith and invited Lutheran intellectuals and theologians to the city.

Negotiations with the king of Poland, Sigismund I the Old, began in March 1525, and on April 8, 1525 the Treaty of Kraków was signed, according to which Albert became the Duke of secular Prussia, which he held as a fief from the Polish king. The treaty was confirmed by the city's representatives. The formal investiture of Albert by Sigismund I took place two days later in the Prussian Homage. By this time Königsberg was already known as a Lutheran city, with its bishop, George of Polentz holding the distinction of being the first Catholic bishop who officially converted to Lutheranism.

Examples of Polish secular old prints

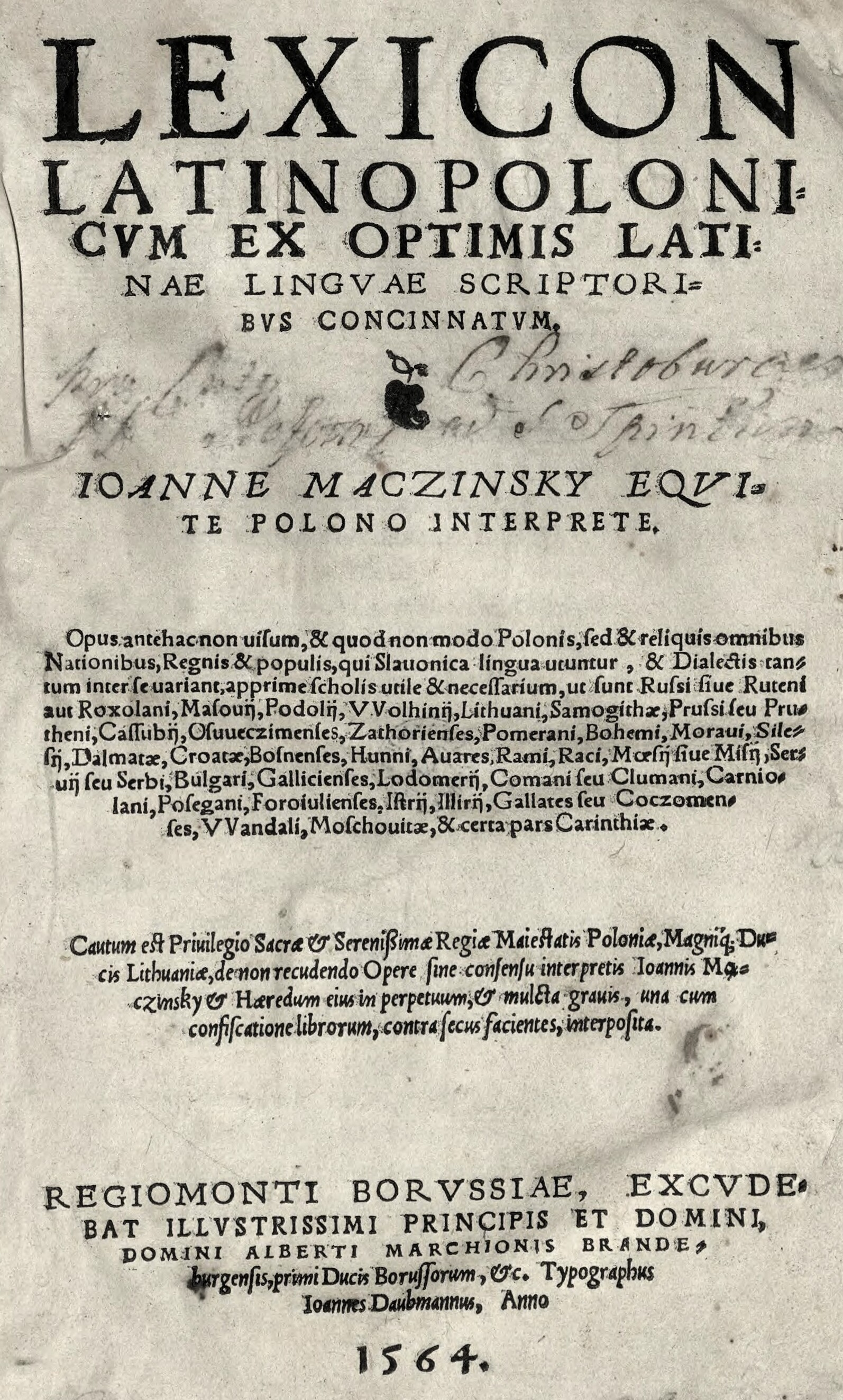
Latin-Polish dictionary by Jan Mączyński, 1564

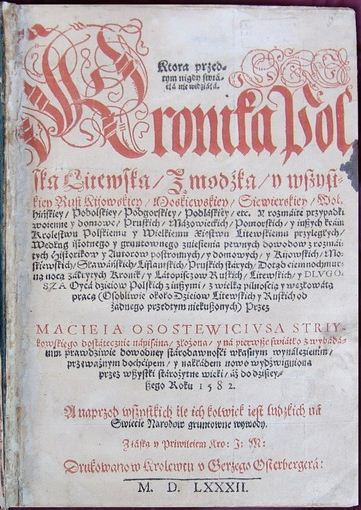
Chronicle of Poland, Lithuania, Samogitia and all of Ruthenia by Maciej Stryjkowski, 1582

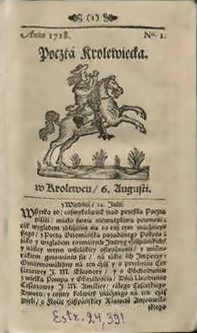
Poczta Królewiecka, the second oldest Polish newspaper, 1718

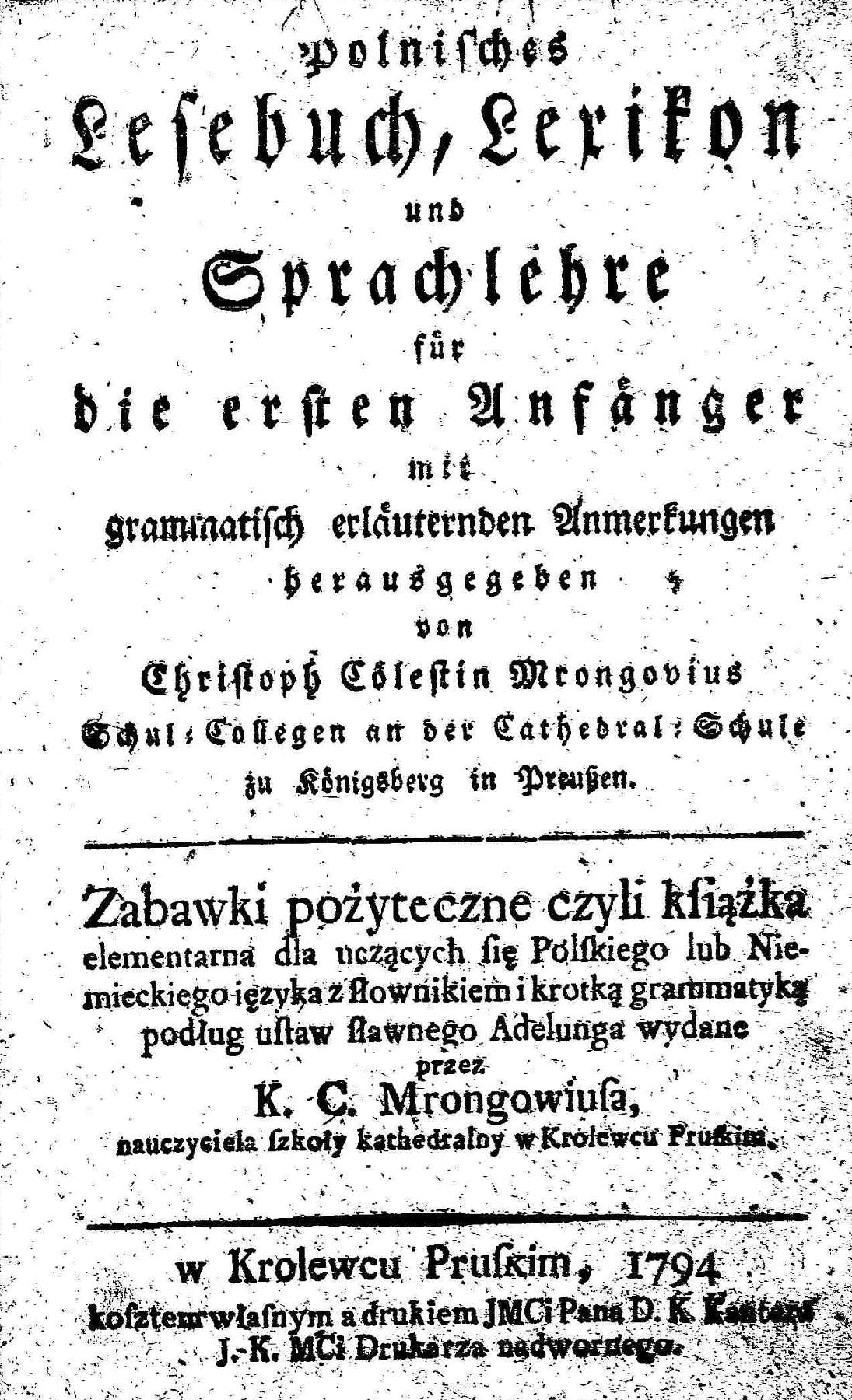
Polish-German primer by Krzysztof Celestyn Mrongovius, 1794

In the aftermath of the Prussian homage Königsberg became a center of Lutheranism in central and eastern Europe. Albert made a conscientious effort to attract Lutheran theologians, including Polish ones, to the city. Since Lutheranism emphasized the importance of vernacular versions of the Bible and other religious works, several prominent Polish translators arrived in Königsberg on the duke's invitation. Their aim was to serve both the Polish speaking Lutheran subjects of the duchy, as well as to proselytize the new faith in Poland and Lithuania. The first notable translators were Jan Seklucjan and Stanisław Murzynowski, who had their works printed in the shop of Hans Weinreich, a native of Gdańsk. Seklucjan and Murzynowski produced the first complete translation of the New Testament into the Polish language, published in 1553, in Königsberg. The first Polish language book published in Königsberg was a Lutheran tract, printed by Weinreich and composed by Seklucjan, Wyznanie wiary chrześcijańskiej ("Confession of the Christian Faith"), published in 1544 and dedicated to the kings of Poland, Sigismund I the Old, and his son Sigismund II Augustus. Other prominent Polish Protestant translators and writers who published their works in the city include Hieronim Malecki and Marcin Kwiatkowski. Important Polish Renaissance writer Mikołaj Rej also published his works there. In 1548, poet Andrzej Frycz Modrzewski visited the city.

At about the same time, with the approval of the Duke, the church in the neighborhood of Steindamm (Kamienna Grobla) of the city functioned as a religious center for local Polish and Lithuanian Lutherans. In 1603, Lithuanian services were moved to the St. Elisabeth's Church, also known as the Lithuanian Church since, and the Steindamm church became a solely Polish church. Services in Polish were also held in the Cathedral, Löbenicht Church and Altstadt Church. There was a Polish cemetery at Steindamm.

Polish catechisms, prayer books and hymnals

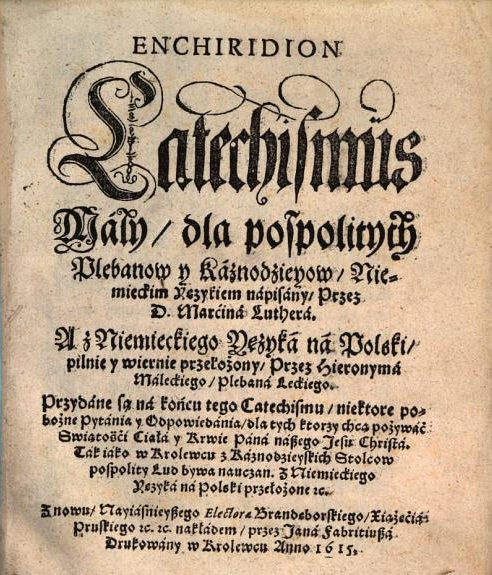
Catechism from 1615

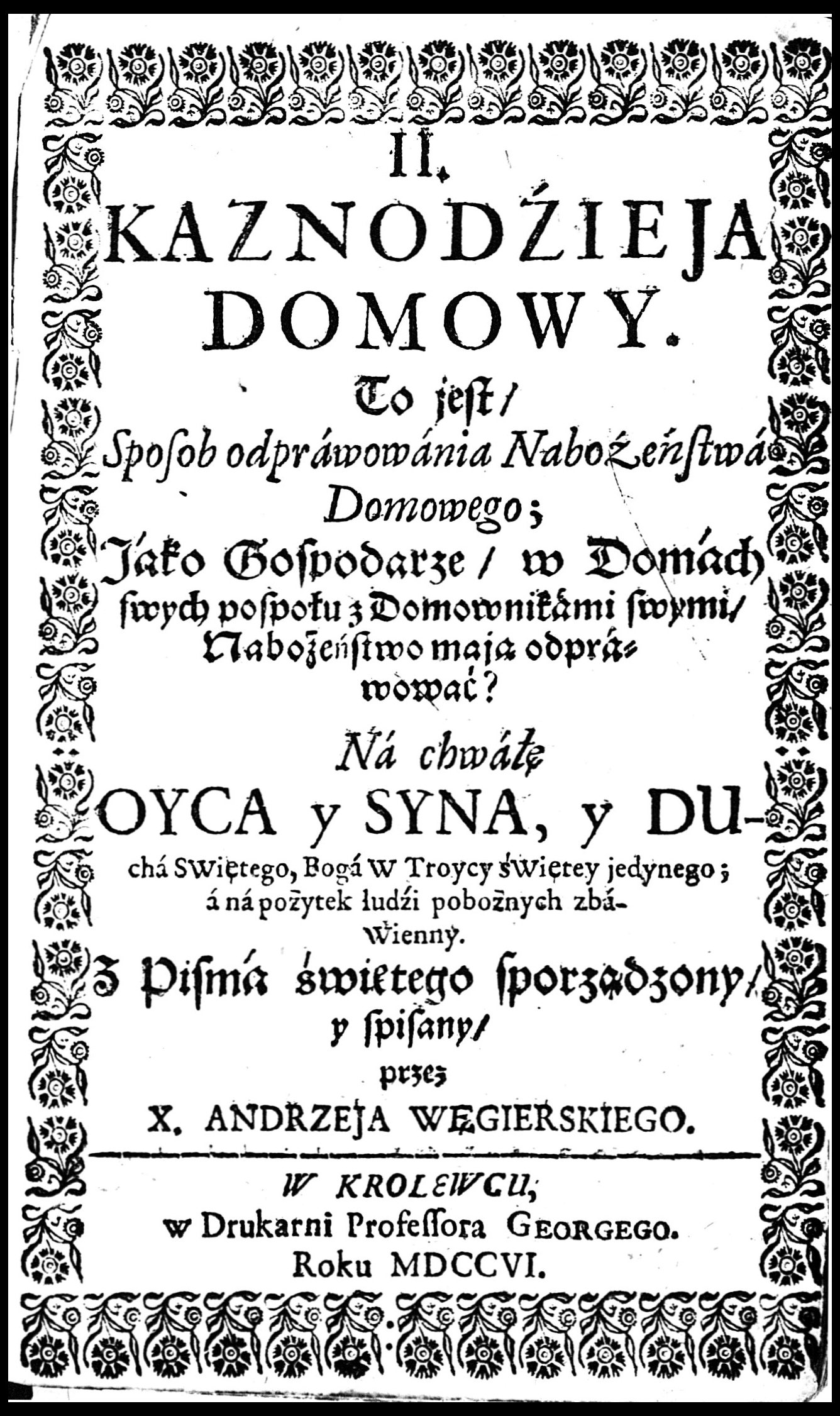
Kaznodzieja domowy, 1706

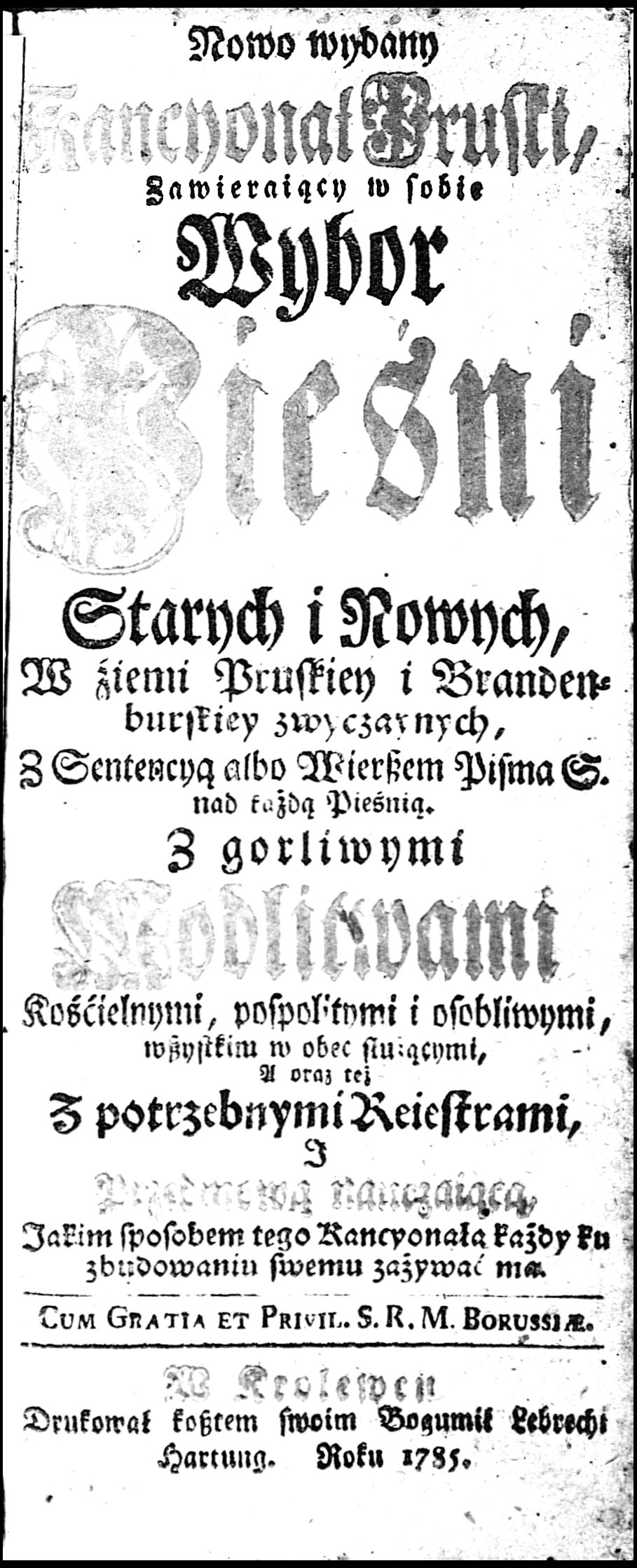
Nowo wydany Kancyonał Pruski, 1785

From the 16th century, Königsberg was the centre of Polish printing. In the 16th century, 104 Polish books were published here, 43 in the 17th century and over 220 books in the 18th century. Mainly Protestant religious literature was printed, as well as multilingual dictionaries, and from the 18th century calendars and secular books. Hundreds of official princely and royal writings were also published in Polish. In 1709, the Polish Printing House was founded by Jerzy Rekuć and later run by Johann Dawid Zänker (Jan Dawid Cenkier).

Johann Dawid Zänker published a weekly magazine, Poczta Królewiecka (lit. 'The Königsberg Post') from August 6, 1718 to the end of 1720. It was published in the Polish language, and was the second oldest Polish newspaper, after the Merkuriusz Polski Ordynaryjny (1661). It focused on regions of Prussia and Lithuania, but was available throughout the entire Polish–Lithuanian Commonwealth. The publication has been praised for the high quality of the Polish language used, and for its significant contribution to the history of the Polish press. A total of 126 eight-page issues were published.

The city remained an important Polish printing center until the early 20th century, with the last Polish book printed in 1931. While most German commentators considered the city "a far-removed outpost, a non-contiguous part of Prussia", it was an important center of Polish and Lithuanian culture as late as in the 19th century, and between 25 and 30 percent of the city's population was Polish.

== Polish Catholicism and Calvinism ==
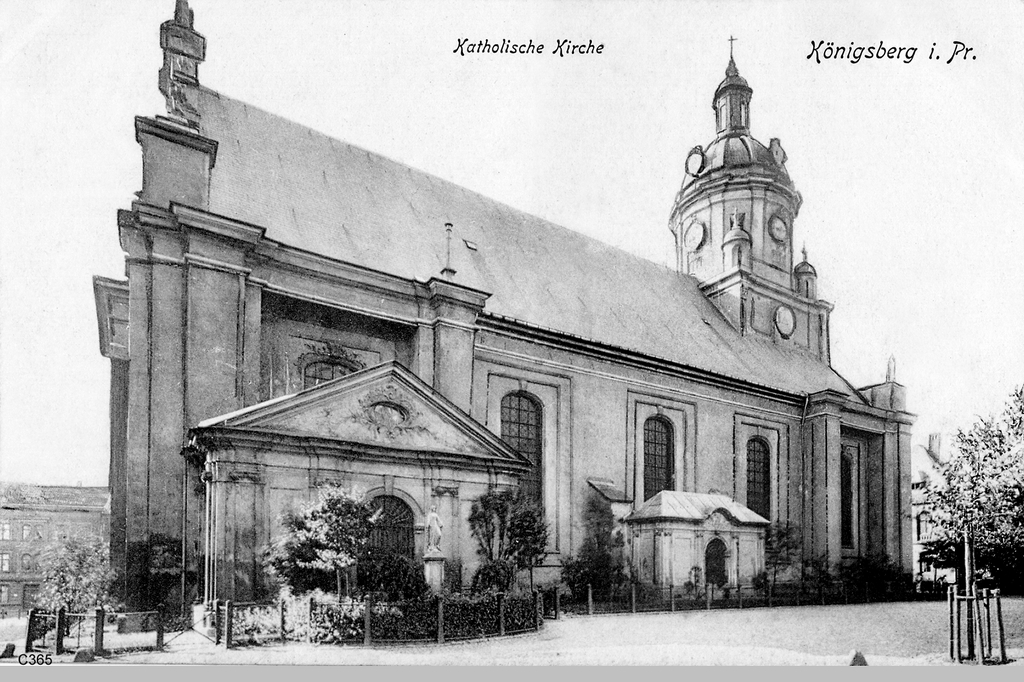
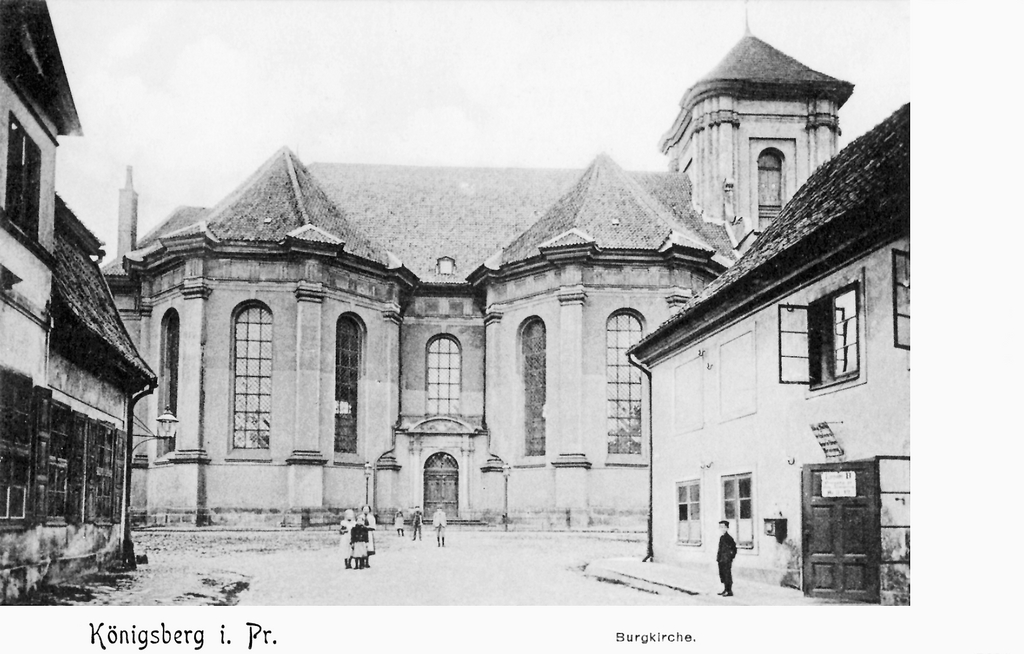
Catholic church and Reformed church, the main churches for the city's Polish Catholics and Calvinists until the 19th century

The first post-Reformation Catholic parish church in the city was built in 1614–1616 in the Sackheim district, thanks to the efforts of King Sigismund III Vasa of Poland and the Polish Bishop of Warmia Szymon Rudnicki. The church was consecrated in the presence of Polish royal commissioners. The parish priests were required to know three languages: Polish, German and Lithuanian, with the Polish language considered the most important, however, most often priests knew only Polish and German and employed a vicar for Lithuanian sermons. The requirement for Catholic parish priests to know Polish was maintained until the second half of the 19th century.

Polish Jesuits were active in the city in 1634–1635 and from 1647, and Polish Queen consort Marie Louise Gonzaga supported the city's Jesuit mission house in 1650–1654. As they were denied permission to build a Jesuit church, the Jesuits were active in the local Catholic parish, and they still opened a Catholic school for Polish and German children. In the second half of the 17th century, there were attempts to expel the Jesuits from the city, but they were defended by the bishops of Warmia, Polish authorities, and even Protestants from Vilnius, who did not want to risk possible reprisals in Vilnius.

In 1649, Poland granted the Reformed Church in the city full religious freedom. The first Polish Reformed Church services were held in the city in 1655 at the Königsberg Castle, later moved to the Reformed school and Reformed church. Wealthy Polish magnate Bogusław Radziwiłł, who became the governor-general of Ducal Prussia in 1657, as a Calvinist, attracted many Polish Calvinists to the city. Radziwiłł was buried in the Königsberg Cathedral. The last Polish Reformed Church service was held in 1806, and the congregation was dissolved in 1843. Until 1821 Polish was part of the curriculum of the Reformed school.

== Trade ==
Initially, in the 14th century, the city probably did not have trade relations with Poland, which were dominated by cities on the Vistula River thanks to their more favourable location. Following the city's incorporation to Poland in 1454, King Casimir IV allowed local merchants to sell goods throughout entire Poland. Afterwards trade contacts with Polish Masovia developed.

Königsberg became the preferred export port, although not the only one, for north-eastern Warmia, central and eastern Masuria, and northern Masovia and Podlachia, with the Narew River marking the southern border of the city's trade hinterland. The more western areas preferred the ports of Gdańsk, Elbląg and Braniewo. Several important trade routes from other places in Poland also led to the city, i.e. the route from Poznań via Toruń, Grudziądz, Kwidzyn, Elbląg and Braniewo, the route from Grodno via Augustów, the route from Warsaw via Serock, Pułtusk, Ciechanów, Mława, Nidzica, Olsztynek, Olsztyn and Lidzbark Warmiński, and the so-called "cattle route" from the interior of Poland via Łuków, Łomża, Kolno and Pisz.

The city acted as an intermediary in maritime trade between the Polish–Lithuanian Commonwealth and the Netherlands, England and France. Many Poles, including noblemen and Polish Jews, came to the city for trade. In 1549, Dutch ships accounted for 25% of all ships leaving the city and 42% of their global tonnage, and in the following decades these figures rose to almost 60% and 70% respectively. The 17th-century stock exchange included a painting depicting a townswoman buying goods from a Pole and a Dutchman, embracing the notion that the city's prosperity was based on trade with the East and West, particularly Poland and the Netherlands. 17th-century wars in the city's trade hinterland in the Polish–Lithuanian Commonwealth caused a decline in trade, which recovered only after 1721.

== Education ==
In the late medieval period, the most popular destinations for studying abroad were the Leipzig University and Jagiellonian University in Kraków.

In 1544, the University of Königsberg was founded, and then granted a royal privilege by King Sigismund II Augustus in 1560, Polish lecturers included Hieronim Malecki (theology), Maciej Menius (mathematics), Celestyn Myślenta (theology), Andrzej Jan Orłowski (medicine), Albert Wojciech Adamkiewicz (medicine), and Jan Mikulicz-Radecki (medicine). Maciej Menius and Celestyn Myślenta were also rectors.

== Late modern history ==
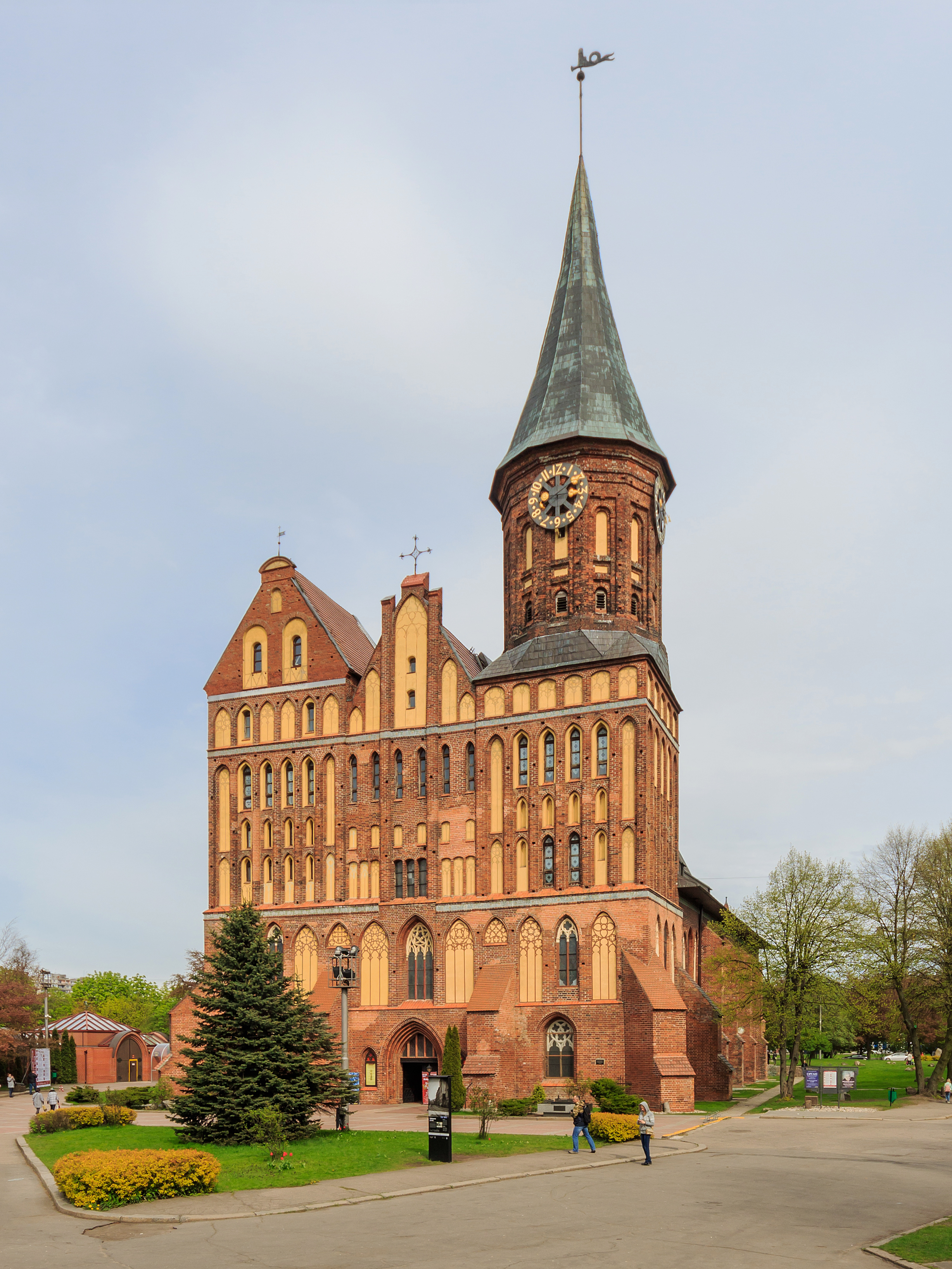
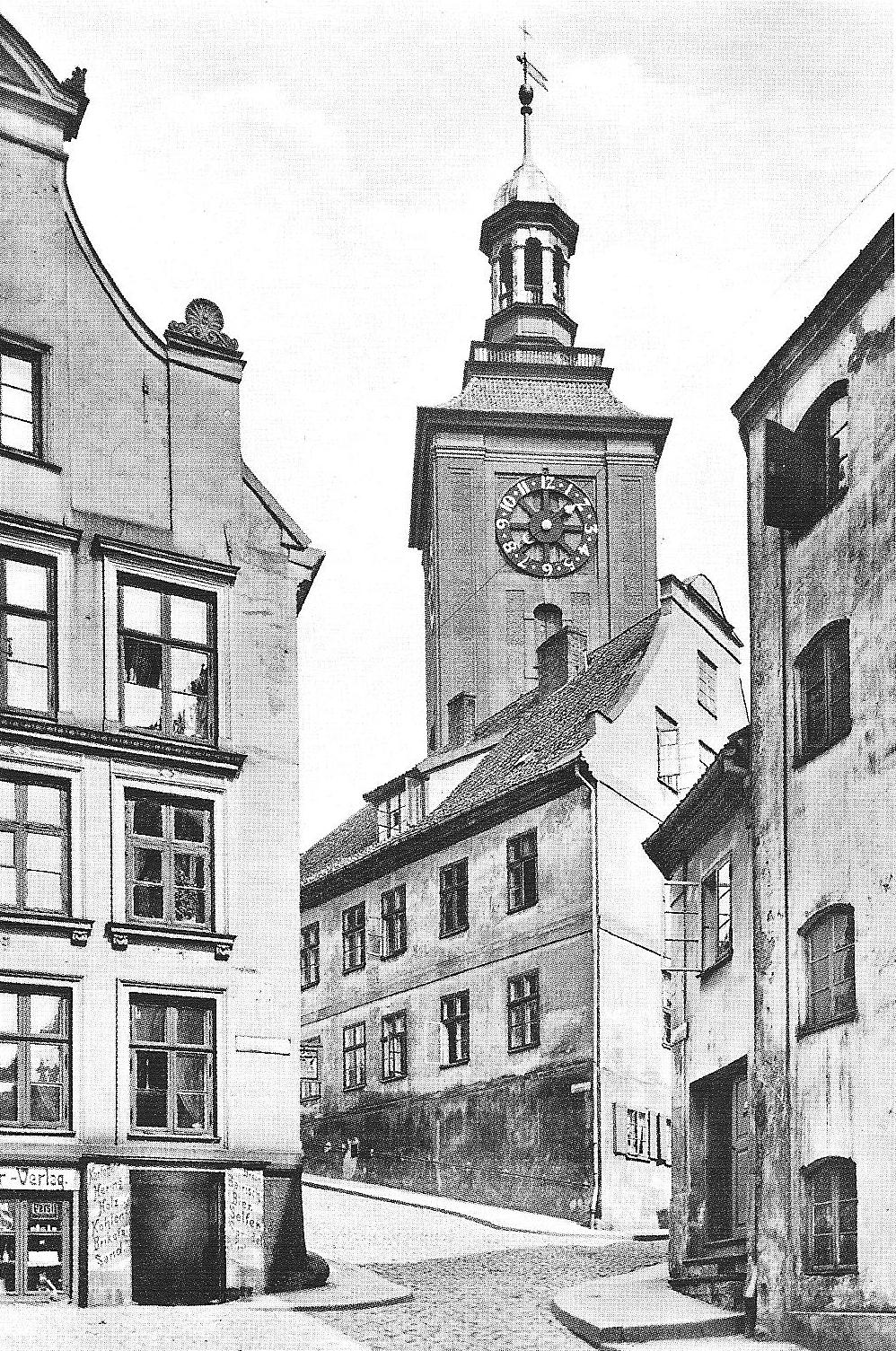
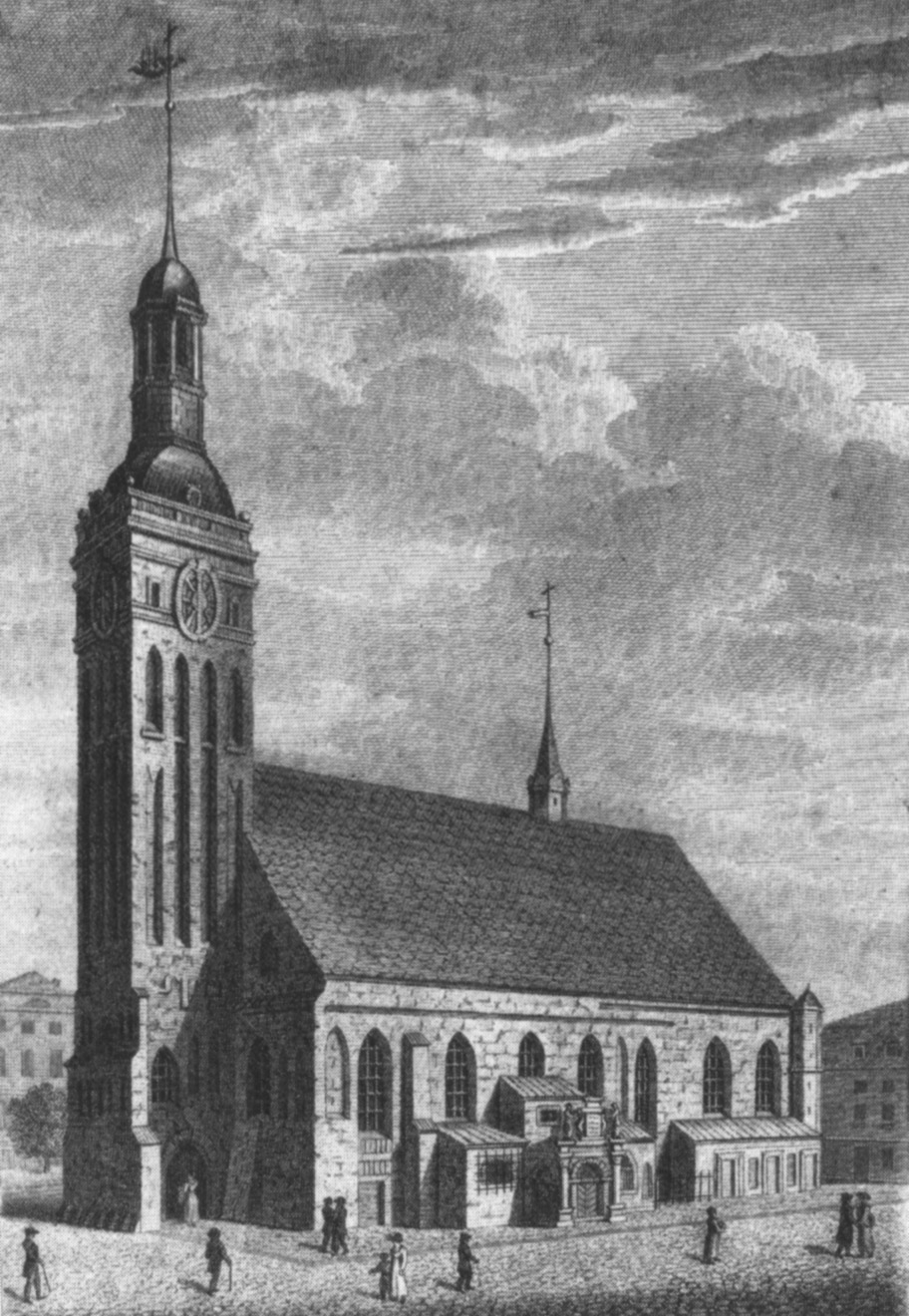
Cathedral, Löbenicht Church and Altstadt Church hosted Polish Lutheran services until 1817

Poles were active in the city during and following the Polish uprisings in the 19th century. Wincenty Pol was interned in the city after the November Uprising and he wrote his first poems there. Józef Bem organized escapes of interned Polish insurgents to Western Europe after the November Uprising. In the 1840s, a local branch of the Polish Democratic Society was founded. During the Spring of Nations of 1848, Poles and part of the German population supported Polish independence endeavors and a Polish-German legion was formed.

In 1862, the city became a center of Polish preparations for a planned Polish uprising, and the Polish resistance imported weapons from abroad and smuggled it to the Russian Partition of Poland. In 1863, the city was the regional center of Polish resistance during the January Uprising. The local Polish resistance imported weapons from France, England, Belgium and Germany, which was then smuggled to the Russian Partition of Poland via Warmia, Masuria and Lithuania Minor. The local Polish insurgent commissioner was Kazimierz Szulc until he was pursued by the Prussian authorities and fled the city in mid-1863. Then he was replaced by Piotr Drzewiecki. One of the participants in arms trafficking was the later Polish historian Wojciech Kętrzynski. On 9 August and 22 August 1863, the Prussians seized weapons in the city that were intended for the insurgents. In the winter of 1863–1864, the city became one of the strongest centers of the Red Faction of the Polish insurrectionists.

The Polish Christian magazine Nowiny o Rozszerzeniu Wiary Chrześcijańskiej was published in the city from 1835 to 1891. During the January Uprising, two new Polish-language newspapers began publishing in the city. In 1863, Pruski Przyjaciel Ludu was launched by the Prussian authorities with the aim of discouraging Poles and Germans from supporting the uprising. After the fall of the uprising, it continued publication to promote pro-Prussian and anti-Polish propaganda among the Polish population. In 1864, the Głos z Litwy insurgent newspaper was printed in the city, although Wilno was stated as the place of publication in order to mislead the Russian authorities.

In the 19th century, the estate of Ratshof was owned by the Batocki family of Polish origin.

=== Persecution under the Nazi regime ===
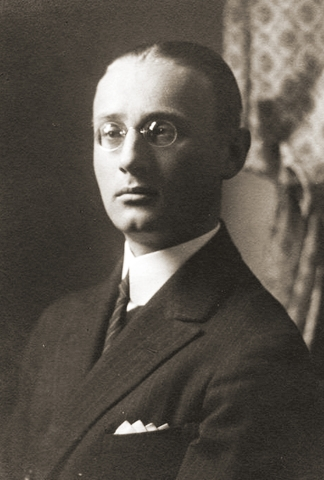
Jerzy Warchałowski, last pre-war Polish Consul General in Königsberg, arrested by Germany in 1939

With the ascent of the Nazi regime in Germany, the Polish and Jewish minorities were classified as Untermensch and persecuted by the authorities. In 1936, the Nazis changed the name of the Polnische Gasse ("Polish Street") to erase traces of Polish origin.

In September 1939 with the German invasion of Poland ongoing, the Polish consulate in Königsberg was attacked (which constituted a violation of international law), its workers arrested and sent to concentration camps where several of them died. Polish students at the local university were captured, tortured and finally executed. Other victims included local Polish civilians guillotined for petty violations of Nazi law and regulations such as buying and selling meat. Nevertheless, the Polish resistance movement was active in the city. One of the region's main transfer points for smuggled Polish underground press was based there, and the Polish resistance conducted espionage of the German industry, including the shipyard.

In September 1944 there were 69,000 slave labourers registered in the city (not counting prisoners of war), with most of them working on the outskirts; within the city itself 15,000 slave labourers were located All of them were denied freedom of movement, forced to wear "P" sign if Poles, or "Ost" sign if they were from the Soviet Union and were watched by special units of Gestapo and Wehrmacht. They were denied basic spiritual and physical needs and food, and suffered from famine and exhaustion. The conditions of the forced labour were described as "tragic", especially Poles and Russians, who were treated harshly by their German overseers. Ordered to paint German ships with toxic paints and chemicals, they were neither given gas-masks nor was there any ventilation in facilities where they worked, in order to speed up the construction of the ships, while the substances evaporated in temperatures as low as 40 Celsius. As a result, there were cases of sudden illness or death during the work.

== Notable Poles connected with Königsberg ==
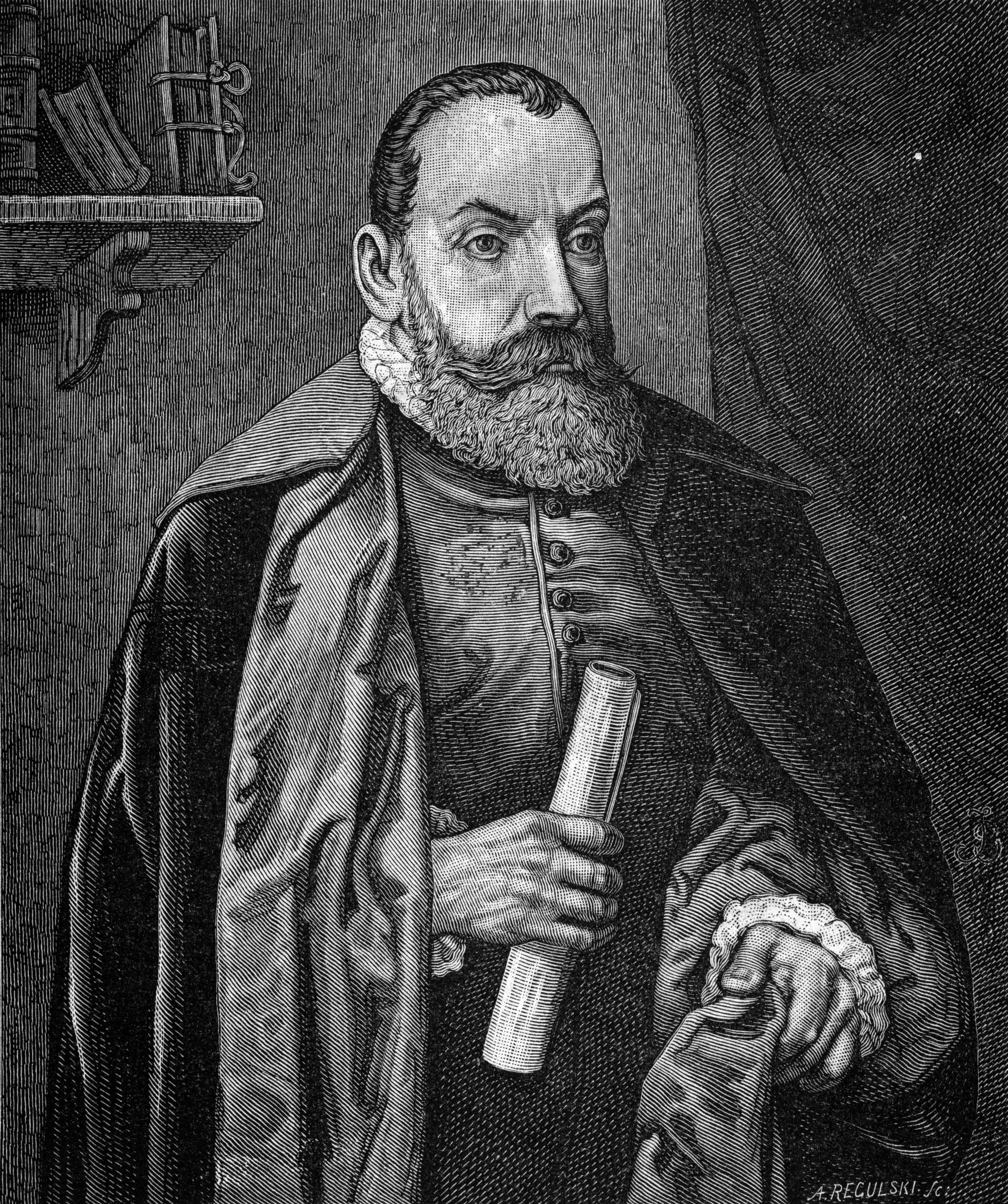
Jan Kochanowski

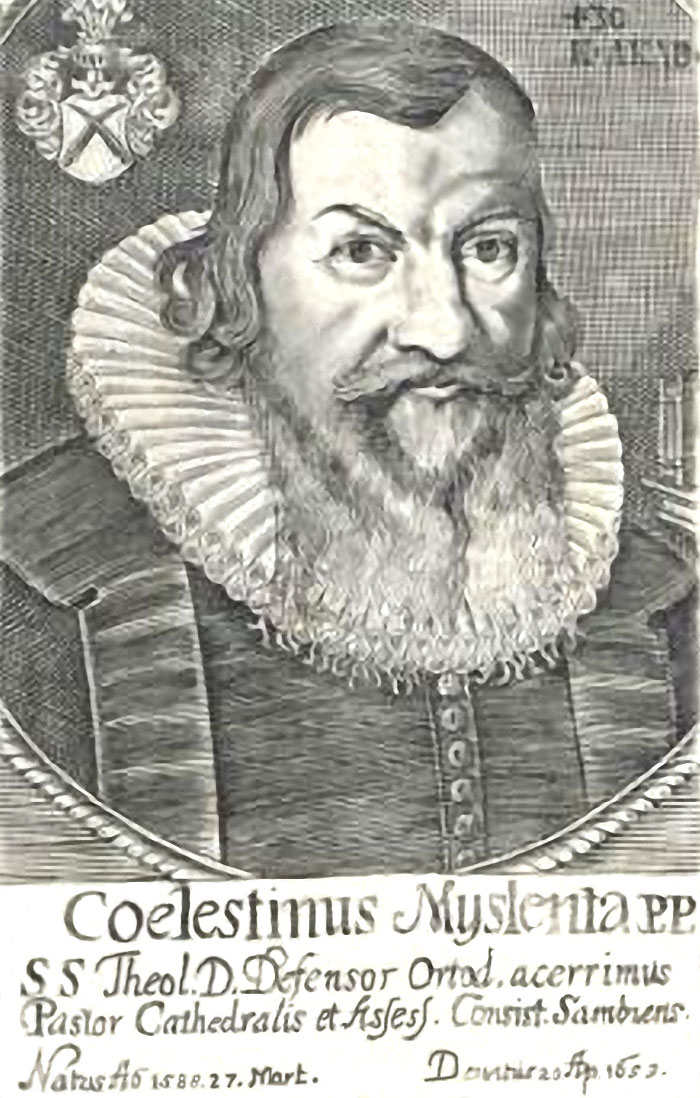
Celestyn Myślenta

- Florian Ceynowa, political activist, writer and linguist
- Gustaw Gizewiusz, political activist, pastor, folklorist and translator
- Łucjan Kamieński, musicologist and composer
- Wojciech Kętrzyński, historian and the director of the Ossolineum
- Julian Klaczko, author and historian
- Andrzej Kochanowski, poet and translator
- Jan Kochanowski, Renaissance poet, commonly regarded as the greatest Polish poet prior to the 19th century
- Piotr Kochanowski, poet and translator
- Hieronim Malecki, pastor, publisher and translator
- Maciej Menius, mathematician, astronomer
- Jan Mikulicz-Radecki, surgeon
- Zbigniew Morsztyn, poet
- Krzysztof Celestyn Mrongowiusz, philosopher, distinguished linguist, and translator
- Stanisław Murzynowski, writer, translator and a Lutheran activist
- Celestyn Myślenta, Lutheran theologian and rector of the University of Königsberg
- Jan Niemojewski, nobleman and theologian
- Jerzy Ossoliński, official, politician, diplomat
- Maksymilian Piotrowski, painter
- Wincenty Pol, poet and geographer
- Bogusław Radziwiłł, Polish princely magnate, Governor of Ducal Prussia, buried in the Königsberg Cathedral
- Ludwika Karolina Radziwiłł, Polish noblewoman and Protestant reformer, born in Konigsberg
- Anna Maria Radziwiłłowa, Polish noblewoman, buried in the Königsberg Cathedral
- Stanisław Sarnicki, historian
- Jan Seklucjan, Lutheran theologian and activist, translator, publisher and printer
- Stanisław Srokowski, geographer and diplomat

== See also ==
- History of Poles in Kaliningrad
- Poczta Królewiecka
- Poles in Germany

== Bibliography ==
- Biskup, Marian (1992). "Królewiec a Polska i Litwa jagiellońska w czasach średniowiecza (do roku 1525)". Komunikaty Mazursko-Warmińskie (in Polish). No. 3–4.
- Bock, Vanessa (2004). "Die Anfänge des polnischen Buchdrucks in Königsberg. Mit einem Verzeichnis der polnischen Drucke von Hans Weinreich und Alexander Augezdecki". In Walter, Axel (ed.). Königsberger Buch- und Bibliotheksgeschichte (in German). Cologne: Böhlau. pp. 127–155. ISBN 3-412-08502-2.
- Friedrich, Karin (2006). The Other Prussia: Royal Prussia, Poland and Liberty, 1569-1772. Cambridge University Press. ISBN 0521027756.
- Górski, Karol (1949). Związek Pruski i poddanie się Prus Polsce: zbiór tekstów źródłowych (in Polish and Latin). Poznań: Instytut Zachodni.
- Groniewska, Barbara (1960). "Rola Prus Wschodnich w powstaniu styczniowym". Komunikaty Mazursko-Warmińskie (in Polish). No. 1.
- Jasiński, Janusz (1994). Historia Królewca: szkice z XIII-XX stulecia (in Polish). Książnica Polska. pp. 80, 103–104. ISBN 8385702032.
- Jasiński, Janusz (2005). "Polska a Królewiec". Komunikaty Mazursko-Warmińskie (in Polish). 2 (1).
- Małłek, Janusz (1992). "Polityka miasta Królewca wobec Polski w latach 1525–1701". Komunikaty Mazursko-Warmińskie (in Polish). No. 3–4.
- Podbereski, Wacław (2010). "Królewiec – Koenigsberg – Kaliningrad". Znad Wilii (in Polish). Vol. 4, no. 44. ISSN 1392-9712.
- Pogorzelski, M. (1931a). "Historyczny przegląd stosunków gospodarczych między Polską a Królewcem". Morze: organ Ligi Morskiej i Kolonjalnej (in Polish). Vol. VIII, no. 4. Warszawa.
- Pogorzelski, M. (1931b). "Historyczny przegląd stosunków gospodarczych między Polską a Królewcem". Morze: organ Ligi Morskiej i Kolonjalnej (in Polish). Vol. VIII, no. 5. Warszawa.
- Pogorzelski, M. (1931c). "Historyczny przegląd stosunków gospodarczych między Polską a Królewcem". Morze: organ Ligi Morskiej i Kolonjalnej (in Polish). Vol. VIII, no. 6–7. Warszawa.
- Zieniukowa, Jadwiga (2007). "Z dziejów języka polskiego w Królewcu" [On the History of Polish Language in Königsberg]. Acta Baltico-Slavica (in Polish). 31: 325–337.
