= Aleksander Augezdecky =

Polish printer and publisher

Aleksander Augezdecky (or Aujezdecki) (born in the early sixteenth century, died in 1577 in Litomyšl) was a Polish printer and publisher of Czech origin.

In the years 1539–1544 he printed in Litomyšl, and some years later led a workshop in Königsberg (Polish: Królewiec).

Augezdecky printed works by Mikołaj Rej, Jan Seklucjan, Stanisław Murzynowski, Grzegorz Orsatius and Eustachy Trepka. While in Królewiec, Augezdecky over the course of eight years published around twenty Polish language works. In 1554 Duke Albert decided to back a different printer, Hans Daubmann and as a result Augezdecky, faced with competition left the city. Around the year 1558 he acquired a printing press in Szamotuły, which he ran until 1561.

He was a member of the Czech brethren.
