= Eustachy Trepka =

Polish Lutheran theologian and pastor

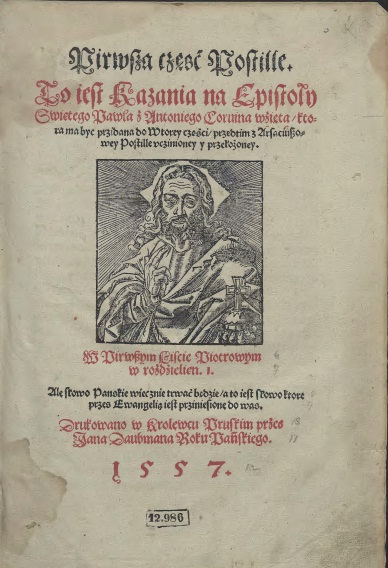
Title page of a Postil published by Trepka in 1557.

Eustachy Trepka (born around 1510, died October 17, 1558) was a Polish Lutheran theologian, pastor, and translator.

Trepka's family had its origins near Sieradz and Wielkopolska. According to some sources his family was nicknamed Nękanda with a coat of arms Topór.

Eustachy attended the Lubrański Academy in Poznań where he was mostly likely a student of the Lutheran theologian Christoph Hegendorff. He was also probably a tutor to the Górka family, who were his protectors. In the 1540s, together with his sponsor Andrzej Górka, Trepka traveled to Wittemberg and met Martin Luther and his collaborator Philipp Melanchthon.

Subsequently, in 1546, he was invited by Duke Albert of Prussia to come to Królewiec (Königsberg, today Kaliningrad), the capital of Duchy of Prussia which at the time was a fief of Kingdom of Poland. There, Trepka was tasked by the Duke with carrying out translations of religious work from Latin into Polish, and he was employed in the print shop of Hans Daubmann. He also published with Daubmann's competitor, Aleksander Augezdecky.

Works translated by Trepka include Mleko duchowne dla karmienia i wychowywania chrześcijańskich dziatek, 1556 ("Spiritual milk for nourishment and upbringing of Christian children"), by the Spanish theologian Juan de Valdés, and the Large Catechism of Johannes Brenz.

Trepka served as the Duke's adviser in regard to Polish affairs and in house translator. His son, Jerzy Trepka, was also employed by the Duke.

Eustachy Trepka was an ideological opponent of the Polish Protestant evangelical reformer Jan Łaski and the Congregationists of Greater Poland.
