= Hieronim Malecki =

Polish theologian and writer

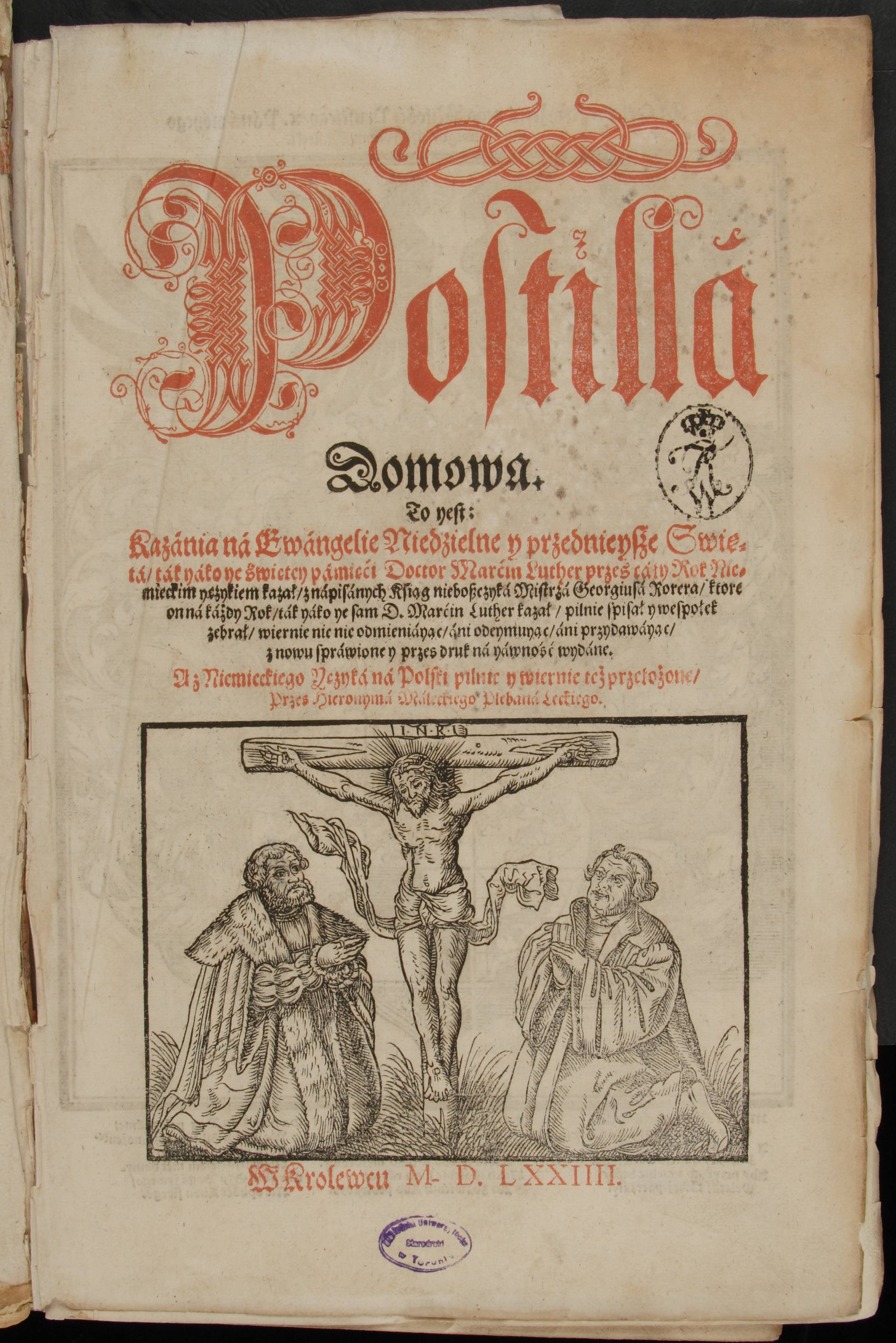
A Polish translation of Martin Luther's postil by "Hieronim Malecki, parson of Lyck (now Ełk)".

Hieronim Malecki (also Hieronymus Maeletius or Meletius) (1527, most likely in Kraków – 1583 or 1584 in Lyck, Ducal Prussia (now Ełk) was a Polish, Prussian Lutheran pastor and theologian, as well as a translator, publisher, writer and creator of literary Polish.

Hieronim Malecki was the son of Johannes Maletius (Jan Malecki) (sometimes referred to as "Jan Sandecki" or "Jan Sandecki-Malecki"), who was a printer of Polish language Lutheran religious literature in Königsberg in Ducal Prussia, then a fief of Kingdom of Poland. Hieronim studied in Kraków at the Jagiellonian University and then at the University of Königsberg.

He worked as a teacher at a Polish school in Lyck and as a translator for the starosta of Lyck. In 1563 he was hired as the resident translator of Polish in the printing house of Hans Daubmann in Königsberg Królewiec. Malecki's translations include Martin Luther's "House Postil" (Postylla domowa, to yest: Kazania na Ewangelie niedzielne y przednieysze święta, 1574, Królewiec), as well as Luther's Small Catechism (Catechismus maly: dla pospolitych plebanow y kaźnodzieiow, 1615, Królewiec) He also published works by his father, Jan, including Libellus de sacrificiis et idolatria Borussorum, Livonum... ("Treatise on the sacrifices and idolatry in Prussia and Livonia", 1563, Królewiec), originally a letter to the rector of University of Königsberg, Georg Sabinus, which Hieronim also published in a German-language version.

In his translations into Polish, Hieronim, following his father, relied heavily on Czech, and even argued that Czech and Polish were a single language. This practice had origins in an argument between Hieronim's father and another Polish translator in Królewiec, Jan Seklucjan.

According to some historians, Malecki may have been the author or co-author of the Sudovian Book.
