= Hans Weinreich =

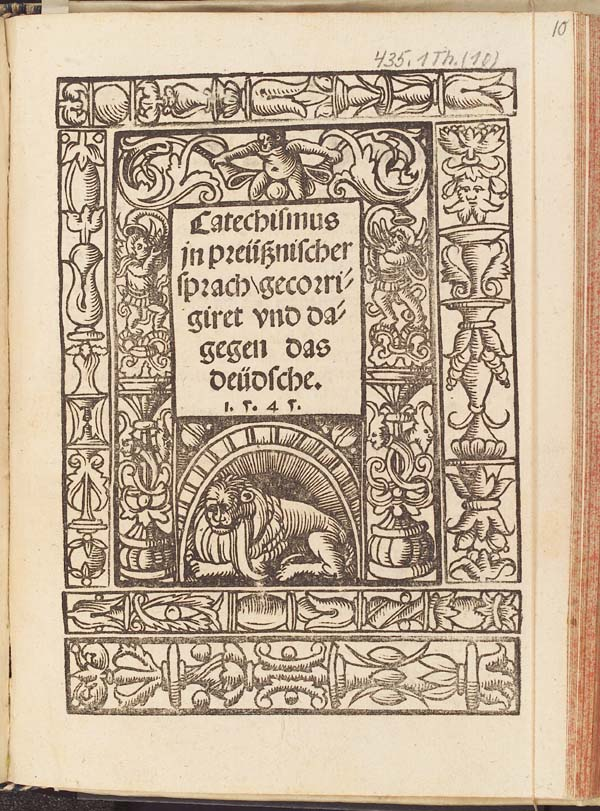
The first printed book in Old Prussian, printed by Weinreich in 1545.

Hans Weinreich (1480/1490–1566) was a publisher and printer of German, Lithuanian and Polish language books in the first half of the sixteenth century. Weinreich was originally from Danzig (Gdańsk) in Royal Prussia, Kingdom of Poland, and then moved to Königsberg (Królewiec) in Ducal Prussia at the invitation of Albert of Prussia.

== Biography ==
Weinreich was most likely born in Danzig sometime between 1480 and 1490, to a well-to-do family. His grandfather shared his name and had four sons, of whom one was Hans' father.

Weinreich's printshop in Königsberg was supposedly located by the castle steps in the city's Old Town.

== Printing activity ==
Weinreich issued his first works in either 1512 or 1513 and moved to Königsberg in 1524. In 1524 he began issuing works in Polish. In 1530 Weinreich published the first translation of Luther's Small Catechism made by an anonymous author. However, the language of the translation was poor, and in 1533 Weinreich printed a second edition made by the Polish philologist Liboriusz Schadlika. Weinreich also issued several works by the Polish Lutheran theologian and translator Jan Seklucjan, although some of these were actually translations done by Stanisław Murzynowski. The published works were translations into Polish of the New Testament and the Catechism, as well as literature and song books. Seklucjan's works printed by Weinreich included the first Polish language hymnal.

Weinreich also printed the first Lithuanian language and Old Prussian language books while in Königsberg, with the former being a translation of Martin Luther's Catechism by Martynas Mažvydas. The first print run of Mažvydas' work numbered between 200 and 300, although only one known copy has survived.

Between 1524 and 1553 Weinreich printed 103 works, of which 59 were in German, 27 in Latin, 13 in Polish and four in either Prussian or Lithuanian.
