= Wojciech Kętrzyński =

Polish historian (1838–1918)

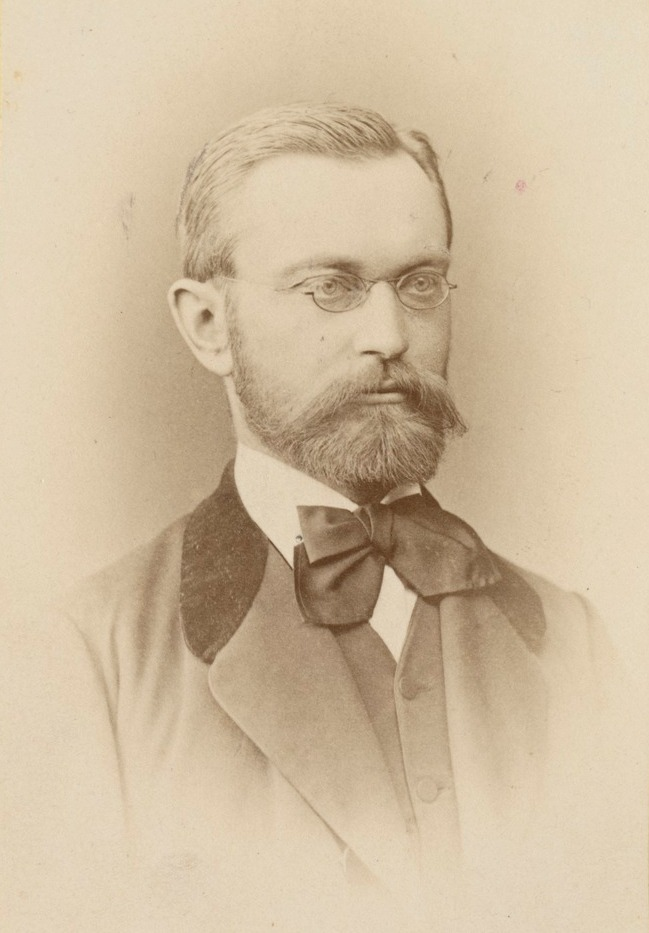
- Kętrzyński in 1881.
- Born: Adalbert von Winkler; 11 July 1838; Lötzen (Lec)
- Died: 15 January 1918 (aged 79); Lemberg (Lwów, now Lwiw), Austrian Empire
- Burial place: Lychakiv Cemetery
- Education: University of Königsberg
- Occupation: Historian
- Children: Stanisław Kętrzyński

Wojciech Kętrzyński (born Adalbert von Winkler; 11 July 1838 – 15 January 1918), was a Polish historian and the director of the Ossolineum Library in Lemberg, then the capital of Galicia, Austrian Empire. He focused on Polish history at a time when Poland was partitioned between foreign powers. He opposed the idea of Germanization and assisted in the January Uprising for Poland's cause. In 1861 he legally changed his name and became a Polish national.

== Biography ==
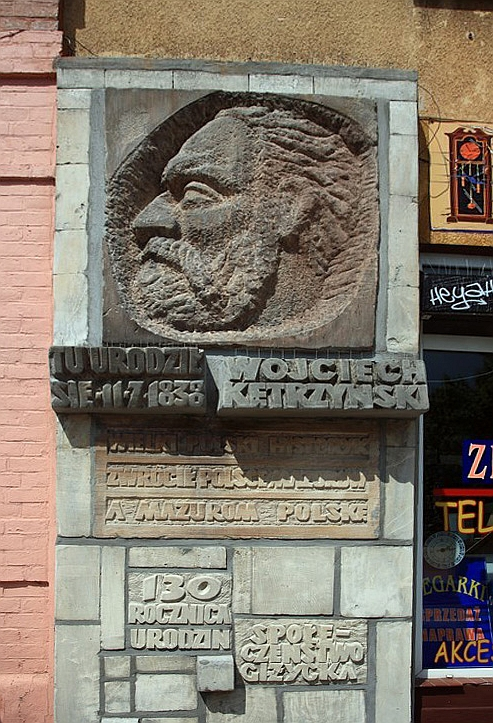
Memorial plaque at Kętrzyński's birthplace in Giżycko

The Kętrzyński-family is of Kashubian origin and settled in Pomerania since the sixteenth century. In 1821 his father had changed his surname to "von Winkler", a direct translation of "Kętrzyński", while he served in the Prussian Army. After he left the military his father became a Prussian policeman (gendarm) at Lötzen in Masuria where he married a local German wife and died in 1846.

Kętrzyński was born in Lötzen (Lec, modern Giżycko) as Adalbert von Winkler, Province of Prussia, within the Kingdom of Prussia, and grew up under the care of a German family after his father's death. He was sent to a military school for soldier orphans at Potsdam in 1849 but returned to Masuria and passed his Abitur at Rastenburg (Rastembork, modern Kętrzyn). In 1856 his sister had discovered the family's ancestry and informed him about it, which caused his decision to identify himself as a Pole, even though he did not read or write Polish and knew only a few words and expressions. As Kętrzyński later wrote, at the time of his national conversion he "was a German and felt himself to be German" and this "decision had been sudden and had raised no doubts". In 1859 he enrolled at the University of Königsberg, still as "von Winkler", but used the name "von Kętrzyński" for his matriculation in 1861. Here he also spoke for the first time Polish to students.

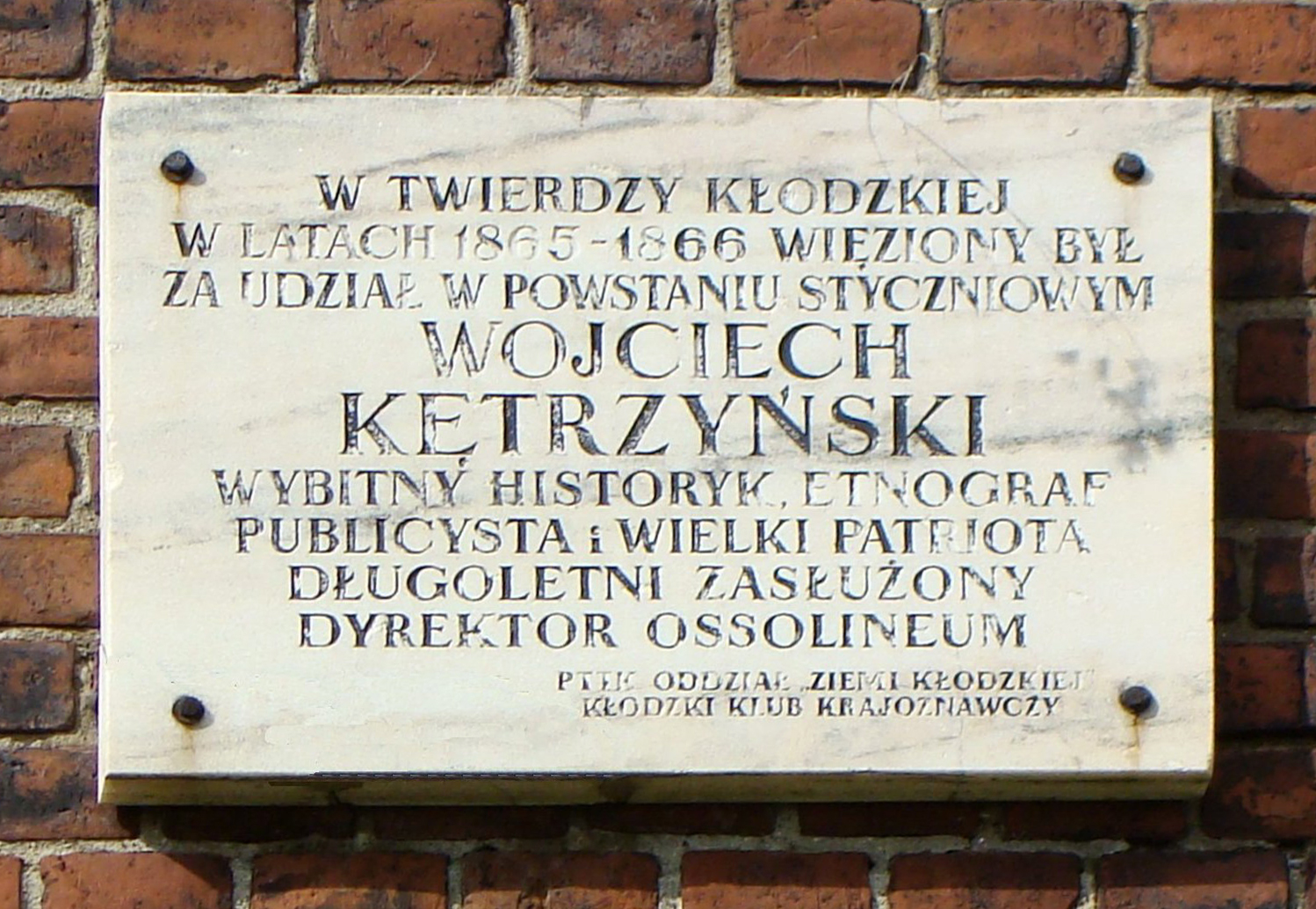
Memorial plaque at the place of Kętrzyński's imprisonment in Glatz (now Kłodzko) in 1865-1866

In 1863 he was imprisoned in Prussia for his support of the Polish January Uprising in the Russian partition and spent his jail time in Allenstein (now Olsztyn), Berlin, and Glatz (now Kłodzko). Throughout his imprisonment he translated his dissertation from German into Latin and Wincenty Pol's "Song of our Land" into German.

After being released from prison, Kętrzyński completed his doctorate at the university of Königsberg and moved to the Kingdom of Galicia and Lodomeria (the Austrian Partition of Poland) within Austria-Hungary to pursue his interests. He became the head (1873) and the director (1876) of the Ossolineum Library in Lwów (Lemberg), then capital of the Kingdom of Galicia in Austria-Hungary. Kętrzyński died there during World War I and was buried at the Łyczaków Cemetery.

== Legacy ==
In recognition of his deeds after World War II, the town of Rastenburg in Masuria, after conquest by the Soviets, (Polish: Rastembork) was renamed Kętrzyn after Kętrzyński in 1946. In Olsztyn a scientific institute was established named after him in 1963, called Ośrodka Badań Naukowych im. Wojciecha Kętrzyńskiego. Its primary mission is to document and research the history of Masurians and their culture in Warmia and Masuria, concentrating on their efforts to oppose Germanization. Another important subject of its research is the structure and administration of Royal Prussia.

He was the father of Stanisław Kętrzyński.

== Works ==
- "Szkice Prus Wschodnich" zamieszczone w "Przewodniku Naukowym i Literackim" Lwów 1876.
- "Nazwy miejscowe polskie Prus Zachodnich, Wschodnich i Pomorza wraz z ich przezwiskami niemieckimi" Lwów 1879.
- "Gazeta polska z początku XVIII w.(Poczta Królewiecka 1718-1720) Lwów 1880.
- "Aus dem Liederbuch eines Germanisierten (1854-1862)" 1883 - confiscated by Prussian and Austrian authorities.
- "O ludności polskiej w Prusiech niegdyś krzyżackich" Lwów 1882.
- "O powołaniu Krzyżaków przez księcia Konrada" Saint Petersburg 1903.
