= Stanisław Kętrzyński =

Polish historian

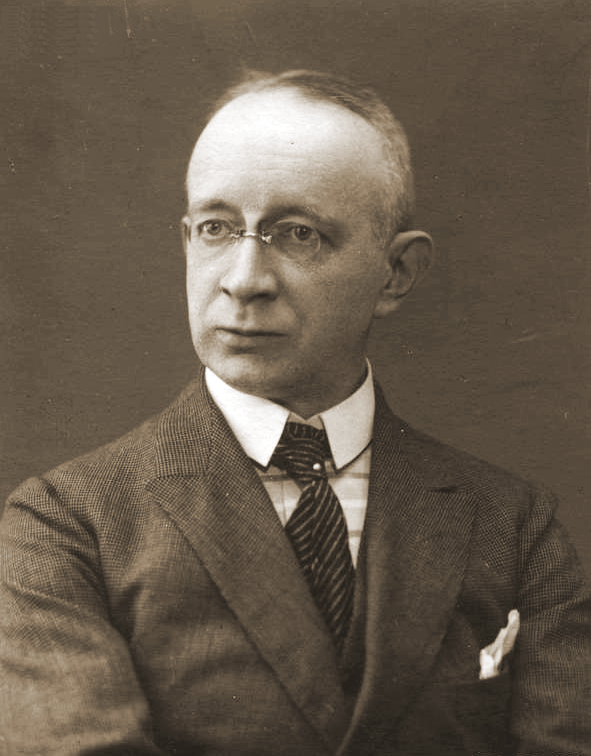
- Born: 10 September 1878; Lwów, Austria-Hungary
- Died: 26 May 1950 (aged 71); Warsaw, Poland
- Burial place: Powązki Cemetery
- Education: University of Lwów
- Occupations: Historian; diplomat
- Parents: Wojciech Kętrzyński (father); Wincentyna de Rautenberg-Klińska (mother)

Stanisław Kętrzyński (Polish pronunciation: [staˈɲiswaf kɛnˈtʂɨɲskʲi]; 10 September 1878 in Lwów, Austro-Hungary – 26 May 1950 in Warsaw, Poland) was a Polish historian, diplomat and freemason.

He was the son of Polish historian Wojciech Kętrzyński.

During the Second World War Stanisław Kętrzyński was a prisoner in the German Auschwitz concentration camp.

Among his students were Stanisław Arnold, Aleksander Gieysztor, Jadwiga Karwasińska and Adam Wolff.

== Works ==
- Gall-Anonim i jego kronika (1898)
- O rzekomej wyprawie Władysława Hermana na Szczecin (1899)
- O paliuszu biskupów polskich XI wieku (1902)
- O zaginionym żywocie św. Wojciecha (1902)
- Ze studiów nad Gerwazym z Tilbury (1903)
- O Astryku Anastazym (1906)
- Uwagi i przyczynki nad kancelaryą koronną Kazimierza Jagiellończyka (1912)
- O datach tzw. niejednolitych w dokumentach polskich (1927)
- Do genezy kanclerstwa koronnego (1929)
- Uwagi o pieczęciach Władysława Łokietka i Kazimierza Wielkiego (1929)
- Na marginesie "Genealogii Piastów" O. Balzera (1931)
- Zarys nauki o dokumencie polskim wieków średnich (1934)
- Ze studiów genealogicznych (1934)
- O zaginionej metropolii czasów Bolesława Chrobrego (1947)
- Polska X-XI wieku (1961, editor Aleksander Gieysztor)
