= Poczta Królewiecka =

Newspaper

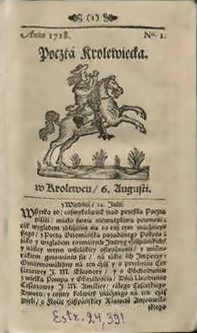
A page from Poczta Królewiecka

Poczta Królewiecka (or The Königsberg Post) was a weekly magazine published in Königsberg (known in Polish as Królewiec) from 1718 to 1720. It was published in the Polish language, and was the second oldest Polish newspaper.

== History ==
The newspaper was published in Königsberg, Kingdom of Prussia, from 6 April 1718 to 28 December 1720. It focused on regions Prussia and Lithuania, but was available throughout the entire Polish–Lithuanian Commonwealth. The publication language was Polish. The volume of publication is unknown, but estimated at few hundred copies. Information on Germany came in the form of translations from German language press such as Koenigliche Preussische Fama, while the news from Poland was mostly original reporting.

It was published on a weekly basis, and primarily included news from Europe, with the focus on the Polish and German lands. The size of the magazine was the so-called "eight", 28x10 cm, and used the Schwabacher font.

It was published by Jan Dawid Cenkier (Johann David Zäncker), and editors included two Poles, the priest Jerzy Rekuć and lawyer Stefan Büschel (first name also given as Georg or Jerzy, second name as Byszel, Bisselius).

126 issues were published: 22 in 1718, 52 in 1719 r. and 52 in 1720. The total output was 1008 pages, not counting any specials.

It is not known why, exactly, the newspaper ceased publication. It is likely that the newspaper did not achieve the desired profitability, as the number of subscribers, particularly in Poland, did not grow fast enough, possibly due to the fact that the newspaper represented a Calvinist point of view, whereas majority of the Poles in Prussia represented other branches of Protestantism, and in Poland, Catholicism.

== Significance ==
It was the second oldest Polish newspaper, after the Merkuriusz Polski Ordynaryjny. The publication has been praised for the high quality of the Polish language used, and for its significant contribution the history of the Polish press.

== See also ==
- List of newspapers in Poland
- Głos znad Pregoły
