= Głos znad Pregoły =

Głos znad Pregoły ("The Voice from the Pregolya"; Russian: Голос с Преголи) is a Polish magazine published since November 1995 in Kaliningrad, as the fifth Polish-language magazine published in the city.

== History ==
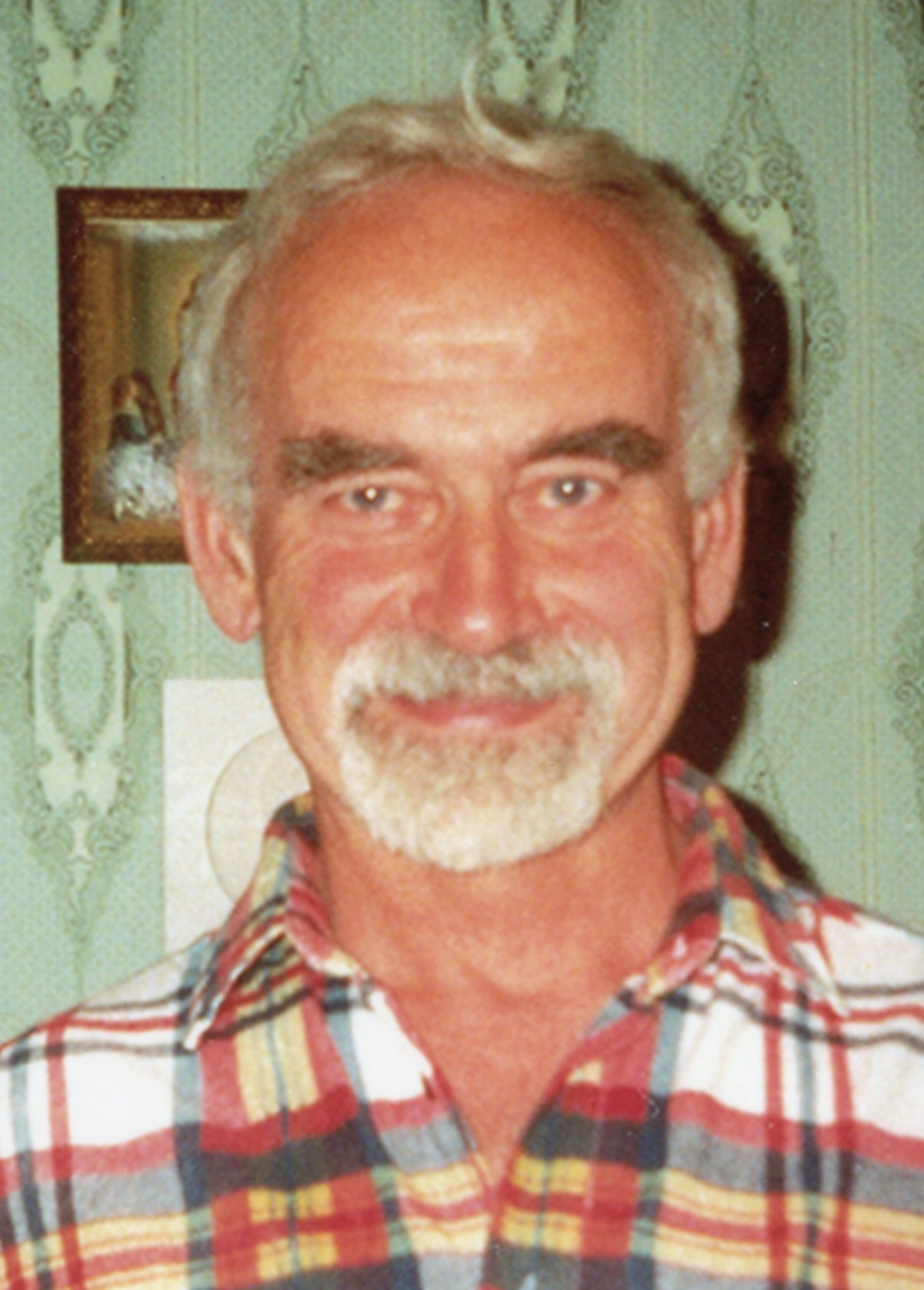
Kazimierz Ławrynowicz, co-founder

The first issue was published on 11 November 1995 from the initiative of Casimir (Kazimierz) Lawrynowicz with the aid of the Polish Consulate in Kaliningrad. Initially the publication was edited in Elbląg by "Kurier Elbląski" with financial support from the local branch of the Polish Catholic-Social Union. Between 1997-1998 Głos znad Pregoły was published by the "Informacyjny Kurier Tygodniowy" from Braniewo, and finally in the summer of 1998, the editorial board was moved to Kaliningrad. Since then, the printing and paper purchase has been financed by the Foundation for Assistance to Poles in the East.

The first editor of the magazine was Casimir (Kazimierz) Ławrynowicz, with ks. Jerzy Steckiewicz, Cleopas Ławrynowicz, Vasily Vasilyev, Danuta Szczęsna, Alexander Ławrynowicz, Agnieszka Abramowicz and George Sukow among the other contributing journalists. The editorial board is currently headed by Maria Ławrynowicz. The Editorial Board consists of Alexander Ławrynowicz, Vasily Vasilyev, Cleopas Ławrynowicz and Marek Szczepaniak. Głos znad Pregoły has correspondents in Kaliningrad, Baltiysk, Ozersk and Chernyakhovsk. Regular columns in Głos znad Pregoły include "Famous Poles in Russia," by W. Vasiliev, "The Community of Polish Culture" by K. Lawrynowicz and the "Polish Road" where you'll find the printed memories of Poles from Kaliningrad.

== Notes and references ==
- (in Polish) Article on the occasion of the Fifth Anniversary of "Głos znad Pregoły"
