= Janusz Jasiński =

Polish historian (1928–2026)

Janusz Jasiński (4 September 1928 – 25 March 2026) was a Polish historian.

== Life and career ==
Jasiński was born in Wołomin on 4 September 1928. He finished an undergraduate degree in history at the Catholic University of Lublin in 1954. He obtained his PhD, under the supervision of Stefan Kieniewicz in 1964 from the University of Warsaw with the dissertation on agrarian reforms in Warmia at the turn of the 19th century ("Reformy agrarne na Warmii w początkach XIX wieku"). He was habilitated in 1982 at the Nicolaus Copernicus University in Toruń on the basis of his work on national identity and consciousness in 19th-century Warmia ("Świadomość narodowa na Warmii w XIX wieku").

Beginning in 1993, he was a professor extraordinarius at the Historical Institute of the Polish Academy of Sciences, and from 1996 a professor ordinarius. Between 1969 and 1980 Jasiński was an editor of the journal Komunikaty Mazursko-Warmińskie (Mazurian-Warmian Communications). As the editor he took special care to establish the journal's independence from the political influence of the authorities of the People's Republic of Poland.

Jasiński published more than 600 works, including 9 books and 13 edited monographs. He was the recipient of numerous awards, including the Knight's and the Officer's Cross of Polonia Restituta, the Secretary's Medal of the Polish Academy of Sciences, the Zygmunt Gloger Award, and others, including an honorary citizenship of the city of Olsztyn. He retired in 1998.

Jasiński died on 25 March 2026, at the age of 97.
