= Christoph Hegendorff =

Protestant theological scholar (1500–1540)

Christoph Hegendorff (1500 – 8 August 1540), of Leipzig, was a Protestant theological scholar and expert of law, an educator, a Protestant reformer and a great, public admirer of Erasmus, whom he called optimarum literarum princeps ("the prince of the best literary style") and theologorum nostri temporis columen ("the pillar of theologists of our times").

Hegendorf matriculated at the University of Leipzig at the age of 13, took his MA in 1521 and went on to teach at the University, being elected its Rector in 1523. He supported himself as a teacher from an early age, and wrote Latin works for his pupils, of which two dialogues were printed appended to Erasmus' Familiarium colloquiorum formulae (Strassburg, 1520). His Latin teaching text Dialogae puerorum ("Boy's dialogues"), combined with the Paedologia of Petrus Mosellanus, also of Leipzig, went through several editions.

In the winter of 1530 he was invited by the bishop of Poznań, Jan Latalski to fill a salaried place as professor of classical literature in Lubrański Academy and to reform the school, a position he was forced from in 1535 over disputes that he was a Lutheran. In 1537 he was legal consultant to the city of Lüneburg and in 1539 he assisted in the reorganization of the University of Rostick.

His published works were copious, one of which, Christiana Studiosae Iuventutis Institutio, was placed on the list of banned books by the Paris University Faculty of Theology.
