= Hans Daubmann =

German printer

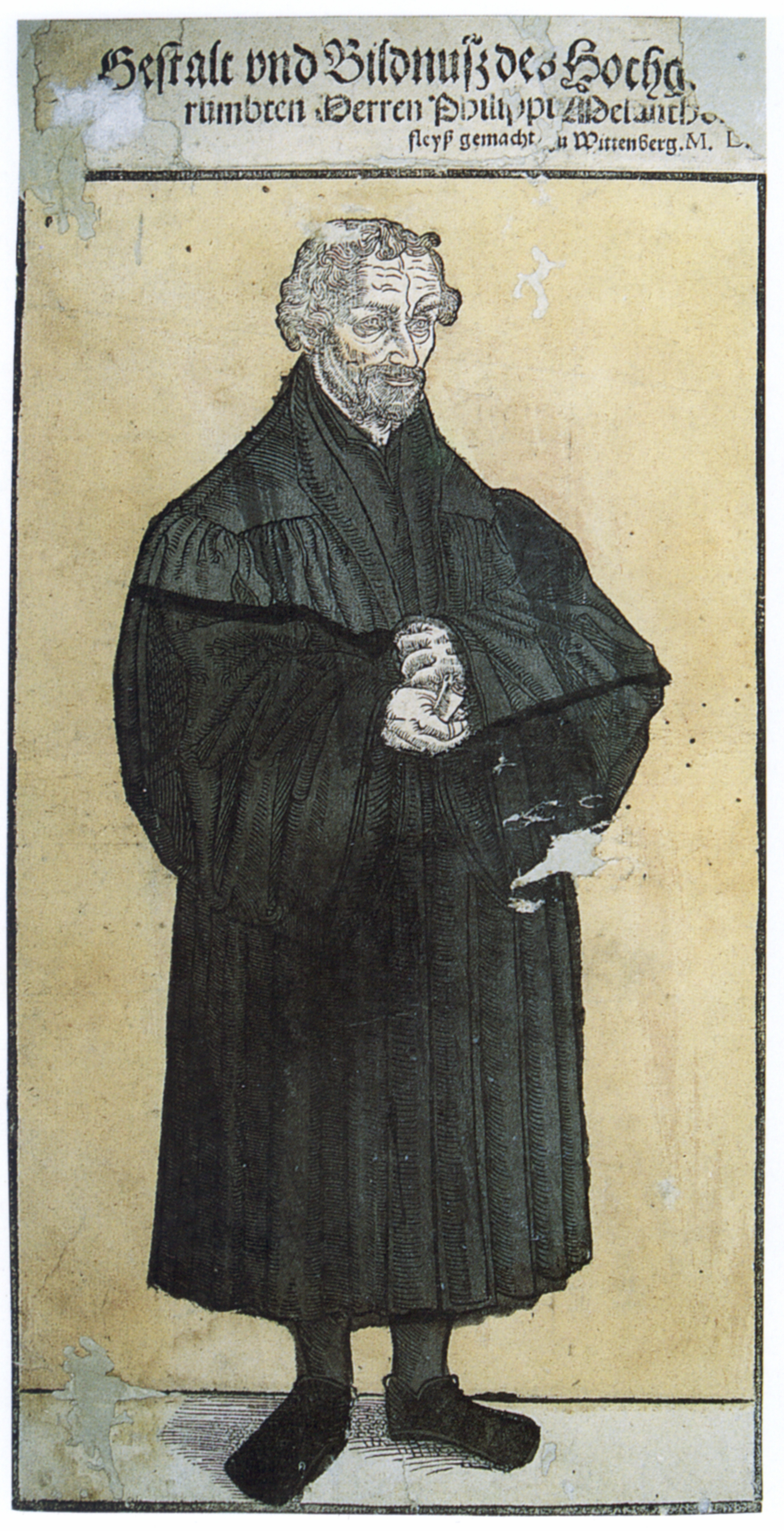
Hans Daubmann

Hans Daubmann (born in Torgau, died in 1573 in Königsberg) was a German printer, active in Nuremberg and then Königsberg, Ducal Prussia (at the time a fief of Kingdom of Poland). He moved to Königsberg in 1554, where he was the official printer of Duke Albert. Daubmann was responsible for printing Lutheran religious texts, as well as the Duke's edicts.
