= Stanisław Murzynowski =

Polish writer and translator (1527/8-1553)

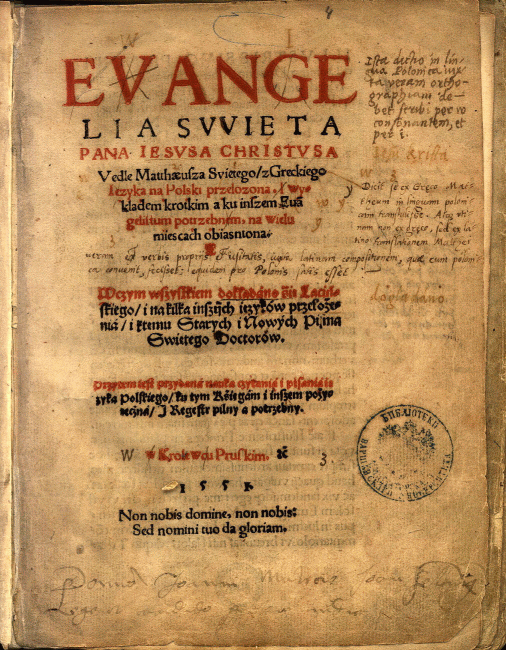
Title page of the Gospel published by Jan Seklucjan (with his annotations), as translated by Murzynowski.

Stanisław Murzynowski (born 1527/8 in the village of Suszyce, died 1553 in Königsberg (Królewiec, today Kaliningrad)) was a Polish writer, translator and a Lutheran activist during the Protestant Reformation. Murzynowski came from a Polish noble family of the Ogończyk coat of arms.

Murzynowski studied at a gymnasium in Królewiec, where he learned Latin, Greek and Hebrew, and then in Wittenberg, where he met Martin Luther and Philipp Melanchthon. He also traveled to Italy in 1547. In 1549 he came back to Królewiec, the capital of Duchy of Prussia which at the time was a secular fief of the Kingdom of Poland. In that year he met Jan Łaski, the Polish Protestant evangelical reformer, who was visiting Królewiec at the time.

Murzynowski was the author of the first complete translation of the New Testament into the Polish language, published in 1553 in Królewiec, although the theologian Jan Seklucjan assumed authorship at the time. One possible reason for why Murzynowski was not given credit contemporaneously may have had to do with his young age, which could have been used by ideological enemies against him. In his translation, Murzynowski used Greek and Latin translation of Erasmus of Rotterdam

Stanisław Murzynowski was also the first person to develop and standardize Polish orthography, most of which has survived until modern times, in his work ""Ortografia polska, to jest Nauka pisania i czytania jezyka polskiego" (Polish orthography, or the science of writing and reading of the Polish language).

Other translations of Murzynowski include works by Andreas Osiander.
