= Jan Seklucjan =

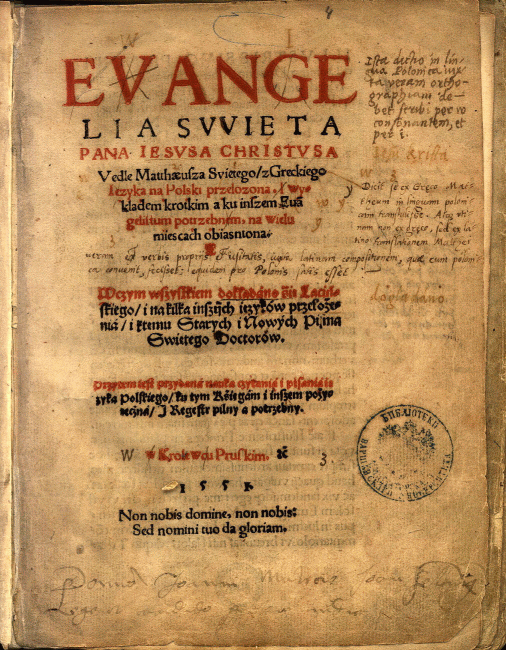
Title page of the Gospel of St. Matthew published by Seklucjan in 1551, only surviving copy.

Jan Seklucjan (born either in 1498 or around 1510, died 1578) (also known as Jan from Siekluki, Seclucian, Seclucianus) was a Polish Lutheran theologian, an activist in the Protestant Reformation in Poland and Ducal Prussia (a Polish fief), translator, writer, publisher and printer.

== Biography ==
Little is known about his early life. According to his name he perhaps was born or came from the village of Siekluki in the Duchy of Masovia, near Radom. Originally Seklucjan was a Dominican. After studying at Leipzig he moved in around 1543 to Poznań, where he served as a Lutheran preacher. Threatened by the local bishop with a charge of heresy, in 1544 he found refuge at Königsberg (Królewiec, today Kaliningrad) in Ducal Prussia, at the time a fief of the Kingdom of Poland. There he lived under the protection of Duke Albert of Prussia and began publishing and printing Lutheran literature in the Polish language. He was encouraged in his endeavors by Duke Albert, who wanted to have the Bible and catechism translated into the vernacular language of the many refugees from Poland, who became his subject. Seklucjan was in charge of the parish of the church in Steindamm (part of Königsberg), which served as a local center for Lutheran Poles. In many of his works he cooperated with the Polish Lutheran theologian Andrzej Samuel.

== Works ==
Seklucjan focused mostly on translations into Polish. In 1544 or 1545 he published a Polish language catechism, entitled Wyznanie wiary chrześcijańskiej (Profession of the Christian Faith), most likely based on Martin Luther's Small Catechism, a second edition of which was printed in 1547. Also in 1547 he published a hymnal, Pieśni duchowne a nabożne ("Holy and divine hymns"), which included 35 religious hymns, including eight written by Luther.

In 1544 Albert of Prussia issued an edict requiring that the Bible be read in Polish to the growing number of Polish Protestants in the Duchy. To that effect he sought to procure a Polish language translator. His first choice was the theologian Rapagelanus, chair at the University of Königsberg. However, Rapagelanus died in 1545 before completing the task. Albert's second choice was the theologian Stapelage, who soon became embroiled in controversy and ended up converting back to Catholicism. It was at this point that Albert commissioned Seklucjan. As a result, in 1551 Seklucjan began publishing translations of the New Testament into Polish. First, in that year, he published the Gospel of Matthew, then the other Evangelists, and in 1553 the complete New Testament. In these translations, Seklucjan collaborated with and relied on Stanisław Murzynowski, and it is likely that most of the translation work was done by Murzynowski, with Seklucjan merely taking the credit.

Additionally, the translation of the New Testament into Polish was delayed by a dispute between Seklucjan and another Polish translator, Jan Sandecki-Malecki. While the origins of the dispute concerned the usefulness of the Czech language as an aid in translating the New Catechism (with Sandecki-Malecki extolling the usefulness of Czech and Seklucjan insisting on purely "Polish words"), it quickly evolved to include doctrinal matters. Ultimately, thanks to support from Andreas Osiander, Seklucjan was given the exclusive right to the translation for four years, although he was forbidden from including his own commentary (aside from a preface).

Seklucjan also wrote original works, including Rozprawa krótka a prosta o niktórych ceremonijach i ustawach kościelnych (A short and simple treatise on some ceremonies and practices of the church"), a poetic dialog between a "student" (the author) who had just come back from travels abroad, and his elders who had stayed home. He also translated the works of the vernacular Polish poet and the founder of Polish literary language and literature, Mikołaj Rej.
