= Königsberg =

Historic German city, now Kaliningrad, Russia

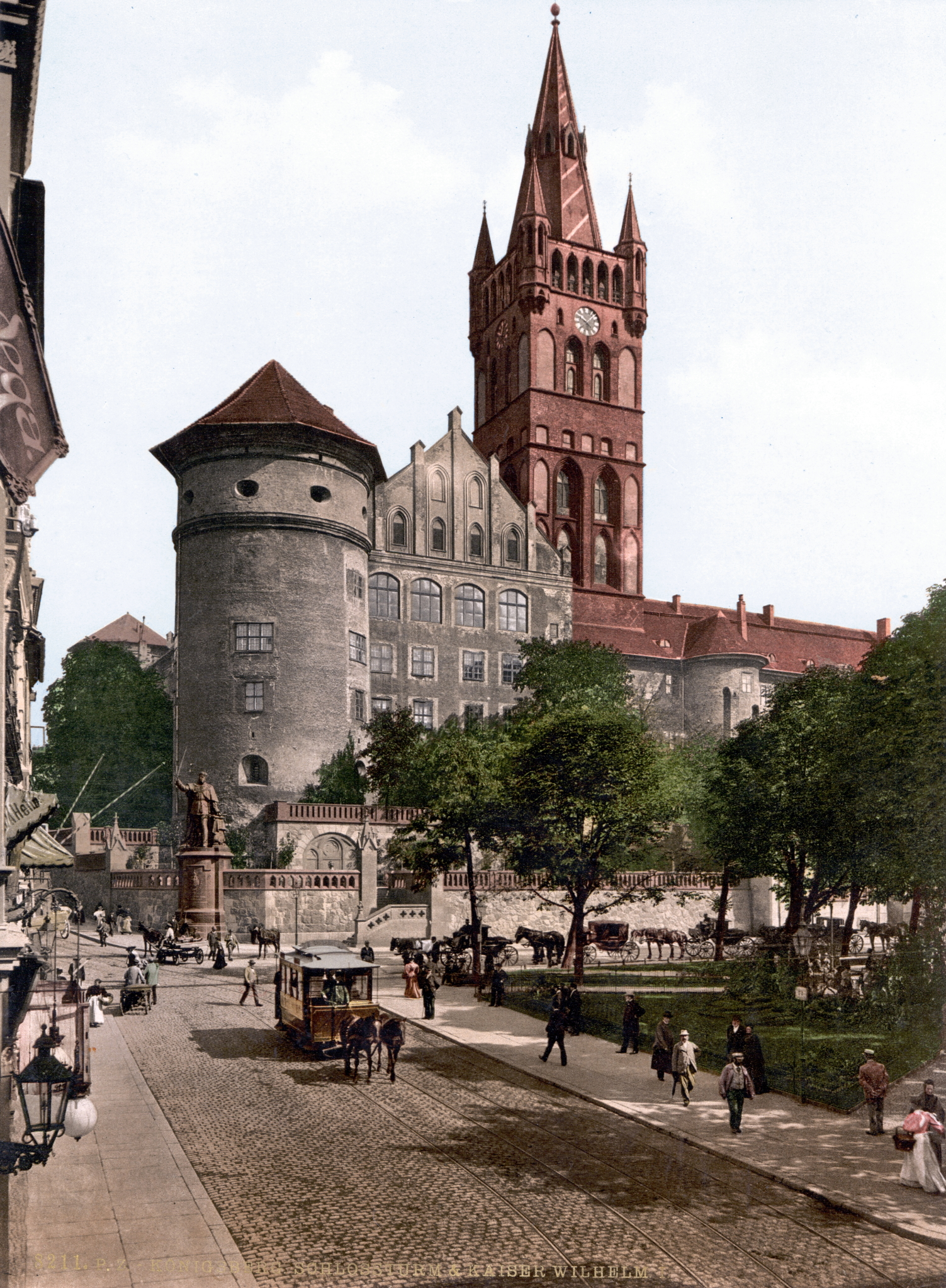
- Königsberg Castle before World War I; ruined in WWII, ruins demolished in 1968–1969 on Soviet leader Leonid Brezhnev's orders

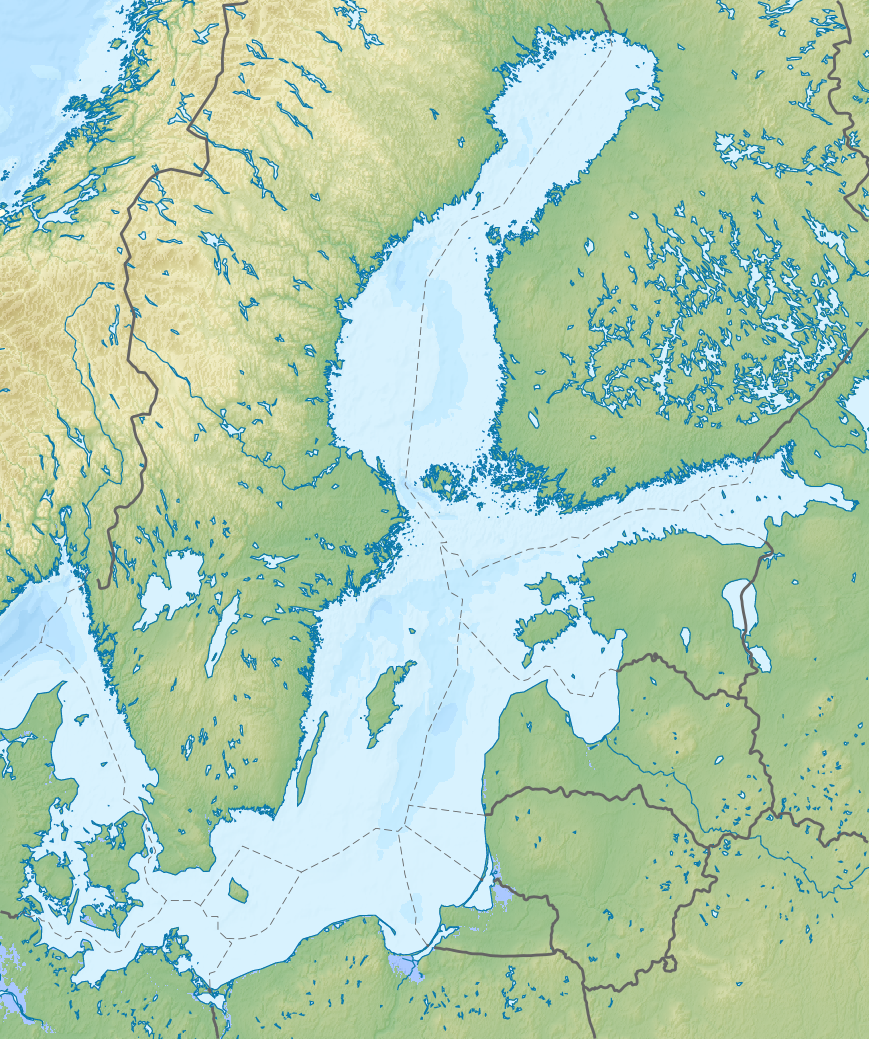
- Königsberg was a port city on the southeastern corner of the Baltic Sea that became Kaliningrad, part of Russia. Königsberg (Europe)
- 54°42′41.3″N 20°30′33.5″E
- Associated with: Germans, Sambians, Poles, Jews, Russians, Lithuanians

History
- Built: 1255; 771 years ago
- Abandoned: 1945; 81 years ago
- Event: World War II

Site notes
- Owner: State of the Teutonic Order, Kingdom of Poland, Duchy of Prussia, Brandenburg-Prussia, Kingdom of Prussia, Russian Empire, German Empire, Weimar Republic, Nazi Germany, Soviet Union, Russia

Königsberg (/ˈkɜːnɪɡzbɜːrɡ/, German: [ˈkøːnɪçsbɛʁk] or [ˈkøːnɪksbɛʁk]) (Note: Polish: Królewiec, Polish pronunciation: [kruˈlɛvjɛt͡s]; Lithuanian: Karaliaučius; Russian: Кёнигсберг, IPA: [ˈkʲɵnʲɪɡzbʲɪrk], lit. 'Kyónigsberg', or Короле́вецъ, Korolévets', IPA: [ˈkɐrɐˈlʲɵvʲɪts]; Belarusian: Караляве́ц, romanized: Karaliavets, IPA: [karaˈlʲavʲɛt͡s].) was a German city established in the 13th century, which after the defeat of Nazi Germany became part of the Soviet Union and was renamed to Kaliningrad in 1946. After the fall of the USSR, Kaliningrad became part of Russia. Founded in 1255 on the site of the Old Prussian settlement Twangste by the Teutonic Knights during the Baltic Crusades, Königsberg (German for "King's Mountain") received its name in honour of King Ottokar II of Bohemia, who led a campaign against the pagan Old Prussians, a Baltic tribe that was native to the area.

A Baltic port city, it successively became the capital of the State of the Teutonic Order and the Duchy of Prussia. Königsberg remained the coronation city of the Prussian monarchy from 1701 onwards, though the capital was Berlin. From the 13th century, it was inhabited by Germans and Old Prussians, then also by Poles, Lithuanians and French Huguenots from the 14th, 15th and 17th centuries, respectively. It was a leading centre of the Protestant Reformation and a publishing centre of Lutheran literature.

A university city, home of the Albertina University (founded in 1544), Königsberg developed into an important German intellectual and cultural center, being the residence of Simon Dach, Immanuel Kant, Johann Georg Hamann, Käthe Kollwitz, E. T. A. Hoffmann, David Hilbert, Agnes Miegel, Hannah Arendt, Michael Wieck, and others. It was the easternmost large city in Germany until World War II. Between the wars, it was in the exclave of East Prussia, separated from the bulk of Germany by the Polish Corridor. The city was heavily damaged by Allied bombing in 1944 and during the Battle of Königsberg in early 1945, when it was occupied by the Soviet Red Army; it was annexed by the Soviet Union on 9 April 1945, and the Potsdam Agreement later that year placed it provisionally under Soviet administration. Its small Lithuanian population was allowed to remain, but the Germans were expelled.

After the war, it was largely repopulated with Russians and, to a lesser degree, Ukrainians and Belarusians from the Soviet Union. It was renamed Kaliningrad in 1946, in honour of Soviet Communist head of state Mikhail Kalinin. The city's historic centre was subsequently demolished by the Soviet government. That geographical area became the capital of Russia's Kaliningrad Oblast, an exclave bordered to the north by Lithuania and to the south by Poland. In the Final Settlement treaty of 1990, Germany renounced all claims to the city and, in general, any lands east of the Oder–Neisse line.

== Name ==
The first mention of the present-day location in chronicles indicates it as the place of a village of fishermen and hunters. When the Teutonic Order began the Northern Crusades, they built a wooden fortress, and later a stone fortress, calling it "Conigsberg", which later morphed into "Königsberg". The literal meaning of this is "King's mountain", in apparent honour of King Ottokar II of Bohemia, who led one of the Teutonic campaigns.

In Polish, it is called Królewiec, in Lithuanian Karaliaučius (calques of the original German name).

== History ==
=== Sambians ===
Königsberg was preceded by a Sambian — or Old Prussian — fort known as Twangste (Prussian word tvinksta means a pond made by a dam), as well as several Old Prussian settlements, including the fishing village and port Lipnick and the farming villages Sakkeim and Trakkeim.

=== Teutonic Order ===
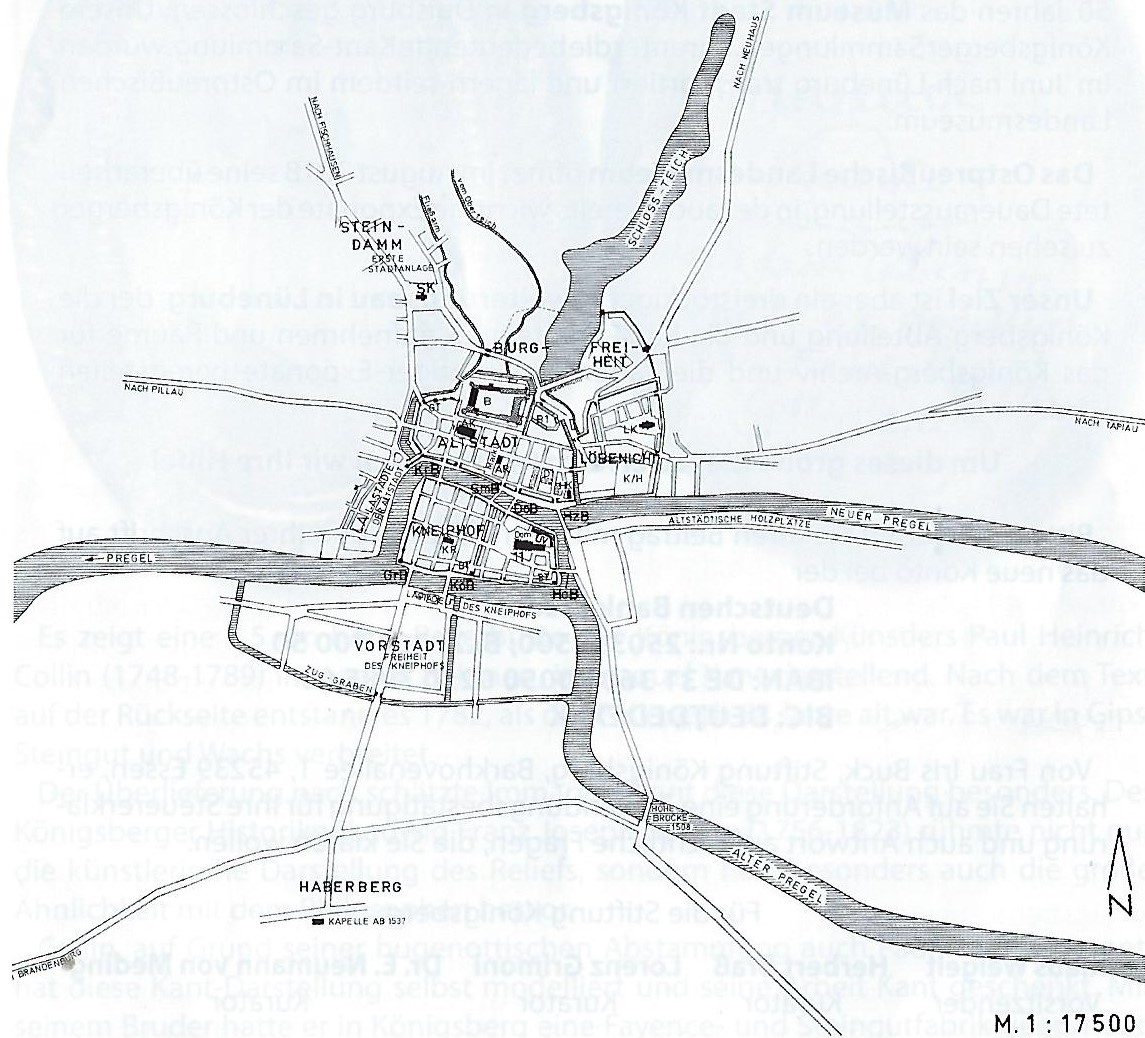
A map of Königsberg in 1255

During the conquest of the Prussian Sambians by the Teutonic Knights in 1255, Twangste was destroyed and replaced with a new fortress known as Conigsberg. This name meant "King's Hill" (Latin: castrum Koningsberg, Mons Regius, Regiomontium), honouring King Ottokar II of Bohemia who paid for the erection of the first fortress there during the Prussian Crusade. Northwest of this new Königsberg Castle arose an initial settlement, later known as Steindamm, roughly 7 kilometres (4 mi) from the Vistula Lagoon.

The Teutonic Order used Königsberg to fortify their conquests in Samland and as a base for campaigns against pagan Lithuania. Under siege during the Prussian uprisings in 1262–1263, Königsberg Castle was relieved by the Master of the Livonian Order. Because the initial northwestern settlement was destroyed by the Prussians during the rebellion, rebuilding occurred in the southern valley between the castle hill and the Pregolya River. This new settlement, Altstadt (Old Town), received Culm rights in 1286. First colonists were mainly armourers, weavers and brewers, and the first privilege for weavers and brewers was granted in 1299. The Old Town's first lokator was Gerko from Dobrzyń. Löbenicht, a new town directly east of Altstadt between the Pregolya River and the Schlossteich, received its own town rights in 1300. Medieval Königsberg's third town was Kneiphof, which received town rights in 1327 and was located on an island of the same name in the Pregolya, south of Altstadt. From the 13th century, the city was inhabited by German colonists and indigenous Prussians, from the 14th century also by Poles, and from the 15th century also by Lithuanians.

Within the State of the Teutonic Order, Königsberg was the residence of the marshal, one of the chief administrators of the military order. The city was also the seat of the Bishopric of Samland, one of the four dioceses into which Prussia had been divided in 1243 by the papal legate, William of Modena. Adalbert of Prague became the main patron saint of Königsberg Cathedral, a landmark of the town of Kneiphof.

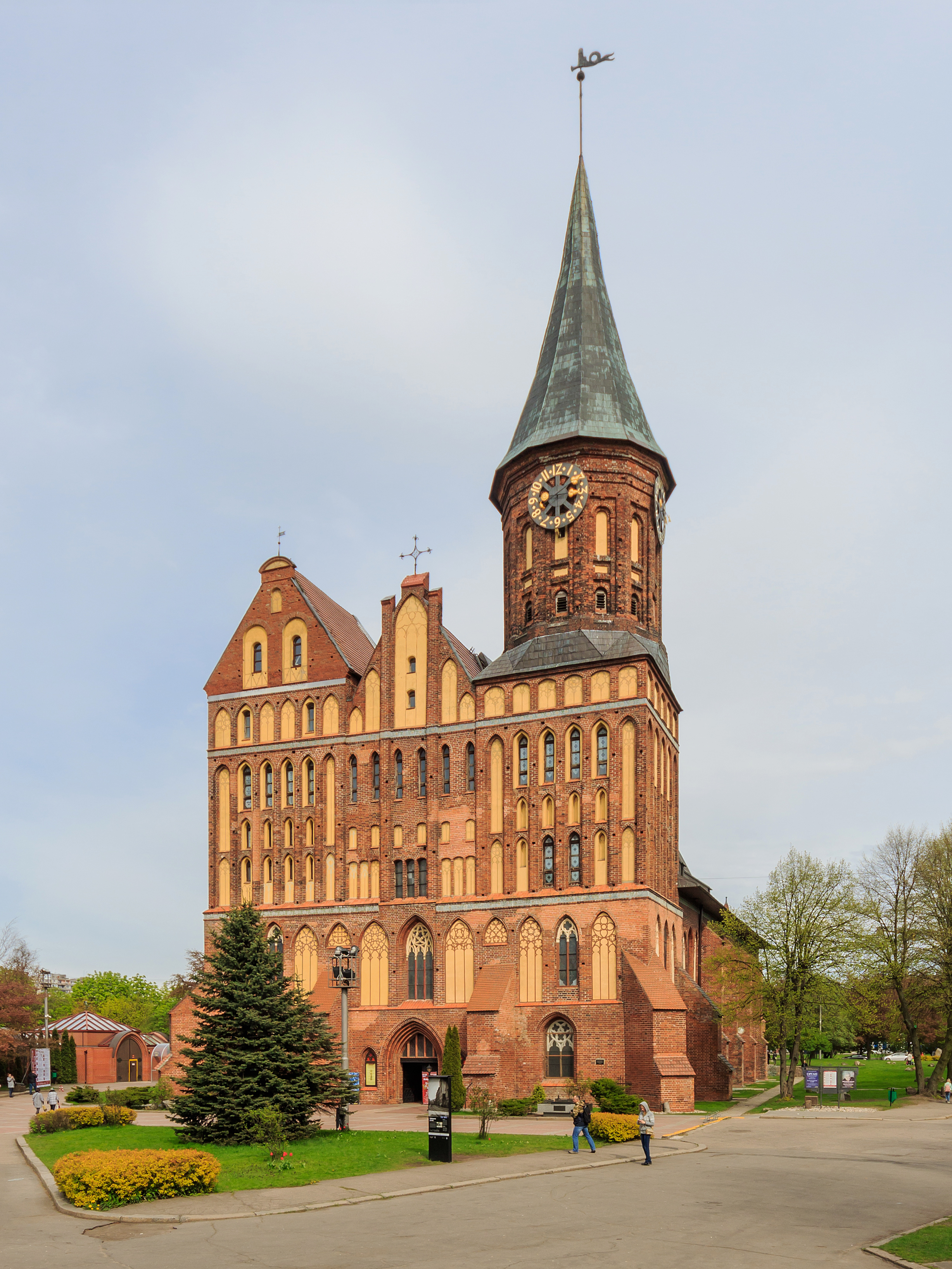
The 14th-century Königsberg Cathedral

Königsberg joined the Hanseatic League in 1340 and developed into an important port for the south-eastern Baltic region. The city was not a significant member of the Hanseatic League at the time, although trade relations with England and Flanders arose, and the city also served as an intermediary in trade between Danzig (Gdańsk) and the Grand Duchy of Lithuania. The chronicler Peter of Dusburg probably wrote his Chronicon terrae Prussiae in Königsberg from 1324 to 1330. After the Teutonic Order's victory over pagan Lithuanians in the 1348 battle of Strėva, Grand Master Winrich von Kniprode established a Cistercian nunnery in the city. Aspiring students were educated in Königsberg before continuing on to higher education elsewhere, such as Prague or Leipzig.

From the late 14th century, in order to finance wars against Lithuania and Poland, the Teutonic Knights imposed new taxes on the city. In return, the city obtained staple right in 1403, which, however, was later violated by the Teutonic Knights themselves.

Although the Knights suffered a crippling defeat in the battle of Grunwald (1410), Königsberg remained under the control of the Teutonic Knights throughout the Polish-Lithuanian-Teutonic War. Livonian knights replaced the Prussian branch's garrison at Königsberg, allowing them to participate in the recovery of towns occupied by Władysław II Jagiełło's troops. In the Battle of Grunwald, the banners of the Königsberg Commandery and the Old Town of Königsberg were taken by the Poles and then displayed in the Wawel Cathedral in Kraków. In the case of a complete Polish-Lithuanian victory, King Władysław II Jagiełło planned to incorporate the city into Lithuania, rather than Poland, within the Polish-Lithuanian union. During the Polish–Teutonic War of 1414, as the Polish-Lithuanian army was only a dozen or so kilometres from Königsberg, houses in Löbenicht began to be demolished to secure the Old Town.

In the 15th century, the merchant-dominated town of Kneiphof opposed Teutonic policies, while the artisan-dominated Old Town and Löbenicht maintained a more conservative stance.

In 1440, Königsberg became a founding member of the Prussian Confederation. In 1454, the Confederation rebelled against the Teutonic Knights and asked the Polish king, Casimir IV Jagiellon, to incorporate Prussia into the Kingdom of Poland; the king agreed and signed an act of incorporation. The local mayor pledged allegiance to the Polish king during the incorporation in March 1454. This marked the beginning of the Thirteen Years' War (1454–1466) between the State of the Teutonic Order and the Kingdom of Poland. The city, known in Polish as Królewiec, became the seat of the short-lived Królewiec Voivodeship. King Casimir IV authorised the city to mint Polish coins, and allowed local merchants to sell goods throughout the entire Poland. On 19 June 1454, a public ceremony was held in the city, during which the mayors of the Old Town, Kneiphof (Knipawa) and Löbenicht (Lipnik) officially recognised Polish rule and paid homage to Poland.

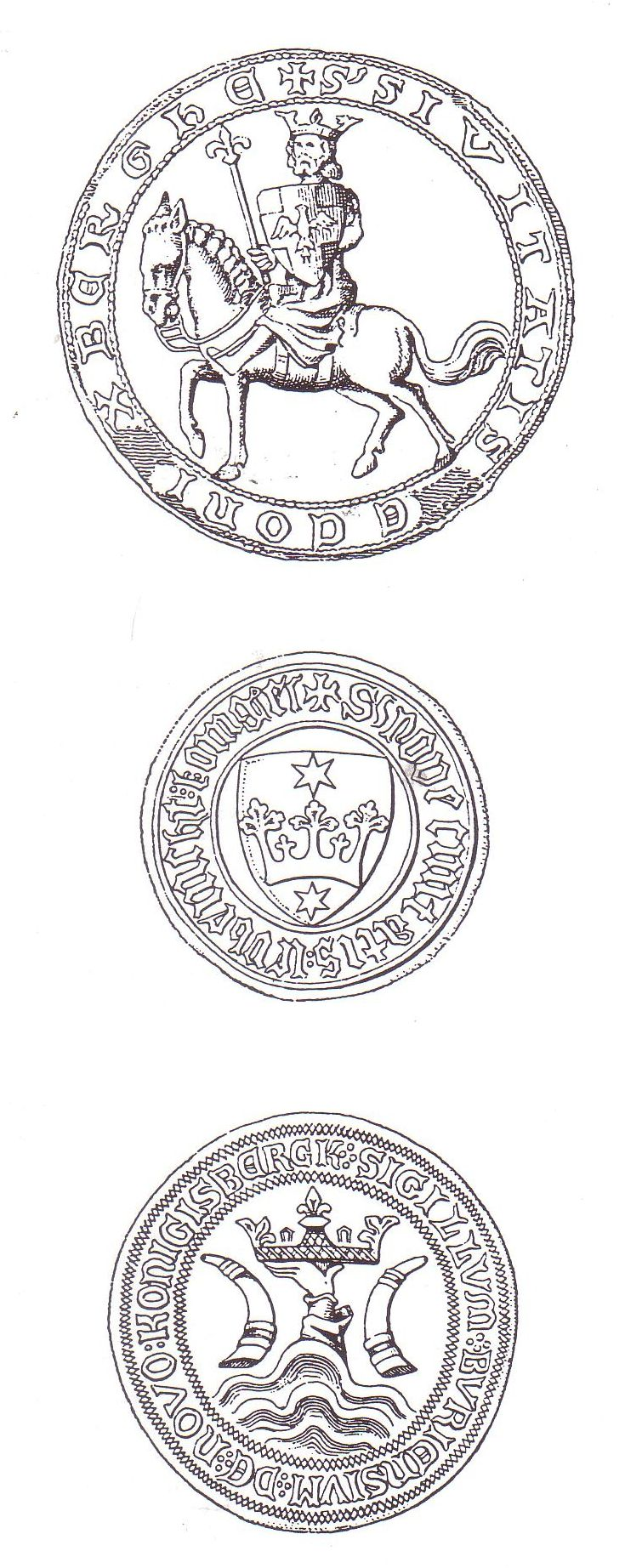
The oldest seals of the three constituent towns of Königsberg: Altstadt (1360), Kneiphof (1383), and Löbenicht (1413)

While Königsberg's three towns initially joined the rebellion, Altstadt and Löbenicht soon rejoined the Teutonic Knights and defeated Kneiphof in 1455. The switching of sides by the Old Town and Löbenicht and the defeat of Kneiphof, as well as the pre-existing trading competition, caused a conflict between Königsberg and Danzig, which sided firmly with Poland, and Danzig actively fought against Königsberg during the war. Kneiphof obtained amnesty and a guarantee of safety from the Teutonic Knights, but this was not upheld, as after the attack of Polish-allied forces from Danzig on the Vistula Spit in November 1455, the knights accused Kneiphof of inciting the enemy and removed its council and burghers. The mayor fled to Stralsund, whereas his son fled to Danzig; the family lost their property.

Grand Master Ludwig von Erlichshausen fled from the crusaders' capital at Marienburg (Malbork) Castle to Königsberg in 1457; the city's magistrate presented Erlichshausen with a barrel of beer out of compassion. In 1465, a landing force from Polish-allied Elbing (Elbląg) destroyed the shipyard near Altstadt, preventing the Teutonic Knights from rebuilding their fleet until the end of the war. In 1465, there was another anti-Teutonic rebellion in the city, but it was suppressed and six townspeople were executed.

In 1466, the city pressed for the Teutonic Knights to accept Polish peace terms, and the mayors of the Old Town and Kneiphof took part in the peace negotiations. Following the Second Peace of Thorn (1466) — which ended the Thirteen Years' War — the reduced monastic state became a fief of the Kingdom of Poland, and Königsberg became the new capital. The grand masters took over the marshal's quarters. The city also broke away from Danzigs's economic influence and took over trade with Lithuania, and trade contacts with Polish Masovia developed. The city established a trading post in Kaunas. In 1467, the city introduced custom duties on ships carrying salt from Danzig to Lithuania. The city also banned the import of beer from Elbing. At that time, the city traded mainly in salt and grain, but also in flax, hemp, wax, potash, and wood.

In 1478, the city came into conflict with Grand Master of the Teutonic Order Martin Truchseß von Wetzhausen, who wanted to cut ties with Poland, and pressured him to pay homage to King Casimir IV Jagiellon.

During the Polish-Teutonic War (1519–1521), Königsberg was besieged without success by Polish forces led by Grand Crown Hetman Mikołaj Firlej. Polish forces captured the Haberberg suburb. The city itself opposed the Teutonic Knights' war against Poland and demanded peace. The city intervened with Albert Hohenzollern to stop his war against Poland, and the mayor of Kneiphof led a delegation to the Polish king, securing a truce.

=== Duchy of Prussia ===
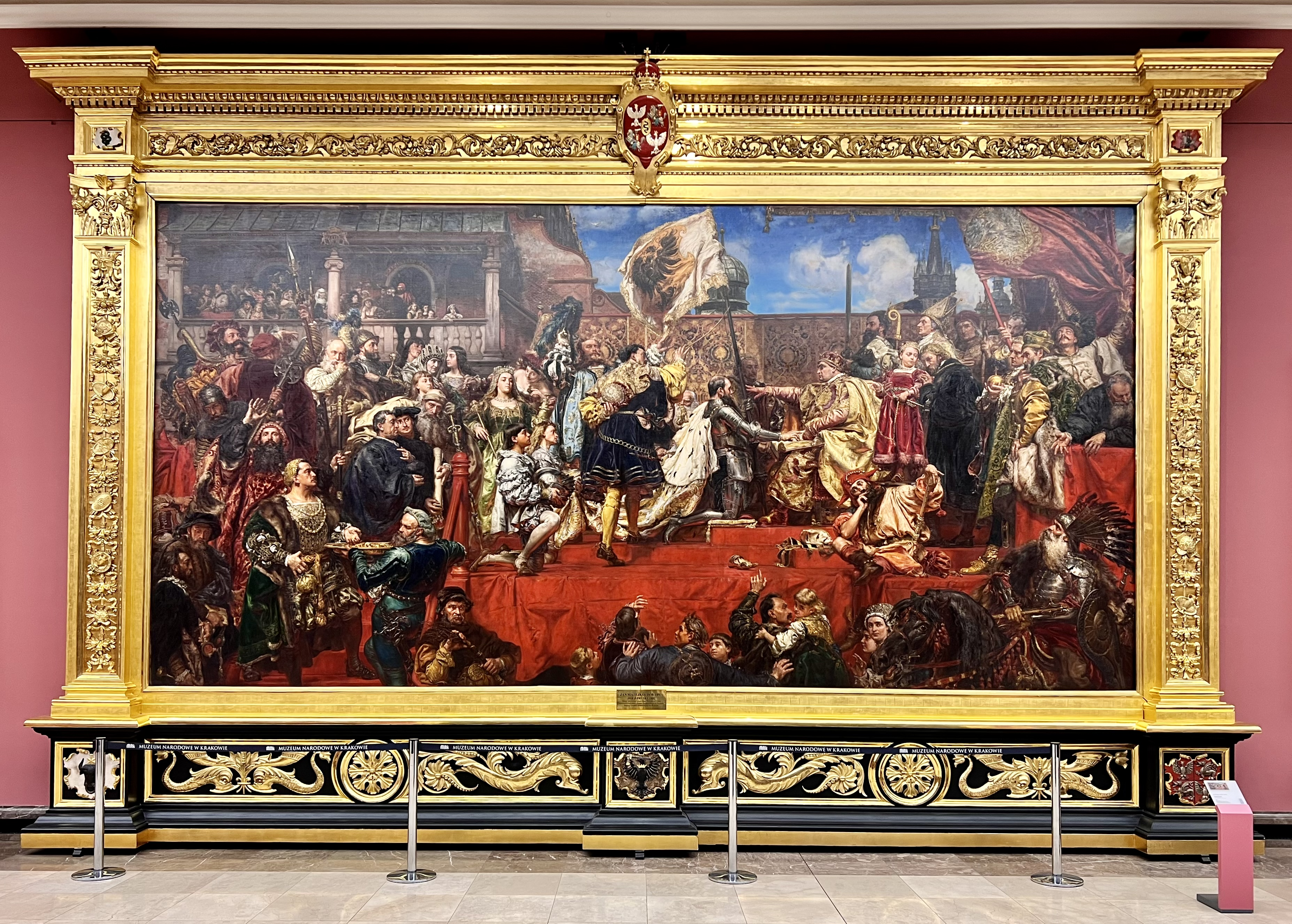
Prussian Homage: Albert of Brandenburg and his brothers pay homage for the Duchy of Prussia to King Sigismund I the Old of Poland, 1525, painting by Jan Matejko, 1882

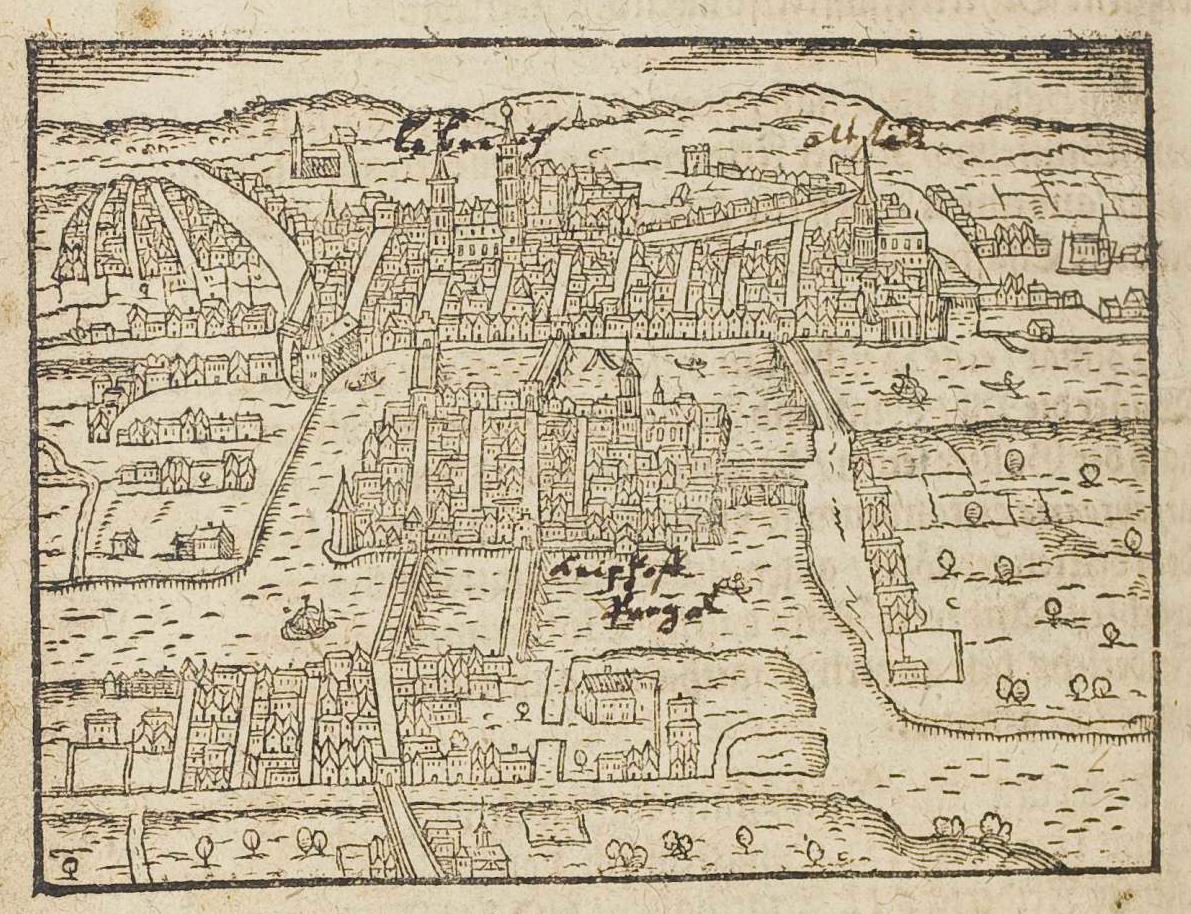
View of the city from the turn of the 16th and 17th centuries

Through the preachings of the Bishop of Samland, Georg von Polenz, Königsberg became predominantly Lutheran during the Protestant Reformation. After summoning a quorum of the Knights to Königsberg, Grand Master Albert of Brandenburg (a member of the House of Hohenzollern) secularised the Teutonic Knights' remaining territories in Prussia in 1525 and converted to Lutheranism. By paying feudal homage to his uncle, King Sigismund I of Poland, Albert became the first duke of the new Duchy of Prussia, a fief of Poland. Königsberg became an influential centre of the Reformation.

While the Prussian estates quickly allied with the duke, the Prussian peasantry would only swear allegiance to Albert in person at Königsberg, seeking the duke's support against the oppressive nobility. After convincing the rebels to lay down their arms, Albert had several of their leaders executed.

Königsberg, the capital, became one of the biggest cities and ports of Ducal Prussia, having considerable autonomy, a separate parliament and currency. Poland functioned as the guarantor of the city's political freedoms.

Königsberg was one of the few Baltic ports regularly visited by more than one hundred ships annually in the latter 16th century, along with Danzig and Riga. The city flourished through the export of wheat, timber, hemp, and furs, as well as pitch, tar, and fly ash. It was the preferred export port, although not the only one, for parts of Warmia, Masuria, Mazovia and Podlachia in Poland, with the Narew River marking the southern border of the city's trade hinterland, and several important trade routes from other places in Poland also led to the city. It was also one of the main ports (alongside Riga and Memel (Klaipėda), and to a lesser extent Danzig and Elbing) for Lithuania. The city acted as an intermediary in maritime trade between the Polish–Lithuanian Commonwealth and the Netherlands, England and France. Many Poles, including noblemen and Polish Jews, came to the city for trade. The 17th century stock exchange included a painting depicting a townswoman buying goods from a Pole and a Dutchman, embracing the notion that the city's prosperity was based on trade with the East and West, particularly Poland and the Netherlands. In 1549, Dutch ships accounted for 25% of all ships leaving the city and 42% of their global tonnage, and in the following decades these figures rose to almost 60% and 70% respectively.

The University of Königsberg, founded by Duke Albert in 1544 and receiving token royal approval from King Sigismund II Augustus in 1560, became a centre of Protestant teaching. The university had a profound impact on the development of Lithuanian culture, and several important Lithuanian writers attended the Albertina (see Lithuanians section below). Poles, including several notable figures, were also among the staff and students of the university (see Poles section below). The university was also the preferred educational institution of the Baltic German nobility.

Polish Kings Sigismund II Augustus and Sigismund III Vasa were hosted by the city very grandly, in 1552 and 1589, respectively.

With the growth of the Scottish diaspora in Poland, the first acquisition of citizenship in the city by a Scotsman occurred in 1561.

On several occasions, the city got into disputes with the Prussian Dukes and sought intervention and confirmation of its rights from the Polish authorities. In 1566, the city's rights were extended and the Prussian dukes were not allowed to interfere in the city's internal affairs by the Polish Royal Commissioners.

The capable Duke Albert was succeeded by his feeble-minded son, Albert Frederick. Anna, daughter of Albert Frederick, married Elector John Sigismund of Brandenburg, who was granted the right of succession to Prussia on Albert Frederick's death in 1618. From this time, the Electors of Brandenburg, the rulers of Brandenburg-Prussia, governed the Duchy of Prussia.

=== Brandenburg-Prussia ===
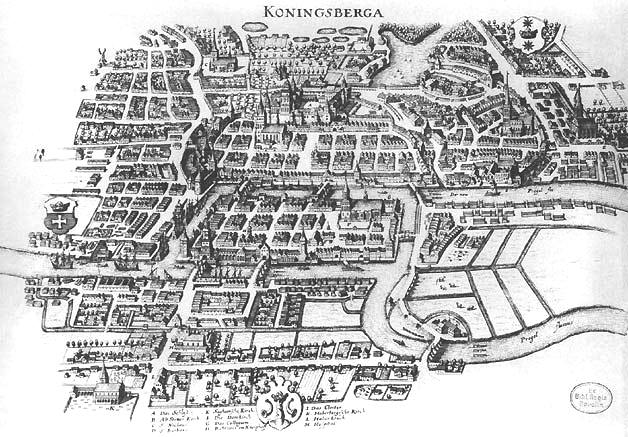
Map of Königsberg from 1651

In the first half of the 17th century, Königsberg played an important role in defending the duchy's feudal ties with Poland. It rejected both the establishment of absolutist rule by the House of Hohenzollern and incorporation into Poland under the direct rule of the Polish king.

In 1635, Polish King Władysław IV Vasa granted the city the right to organise its military defence against a possible Swedish attack in exchange for exemption from paying taxes to Prussian dukes. King Władysław IV Vasa was hosted in the city very grandly during his visits in 1635 and 1636. He appointed Jerzy Ossoliński as the Polish governor of the duchy in 1636. Ossoliński resided in the city and completed the fortification of the city against a potential Swedish attack.

When Imperial and then Swedish armies overran Brandenburg during the Thirty Years' War of 1618–1648, the Hohenzollern court fled to Königsberg. On 1 November 1641, Elector Frederick William persuaded the Prussian diet to accept an excise tax.

After Sweden's invasion of Poland in 1655, the city willingly passed new taxes to finance the fight against the invaders. Frederick William's support for Sweden against Poland was met with opposition from the city, which stopped paying taxes and demanded the expulsion of the Brandenburg troops. In the Treaty of Königsberg of January 1656, the elector recognised his Duchy of Prussia as a fief of Sweden. In the Treaty of Wehlau in 1657, however, he negotiated the release of Prussia from Polish sovereignty in return for an alliance with Poland. The 1660 Treaty of Oliva confirmed Prussian independence from both Poland and Sweden.

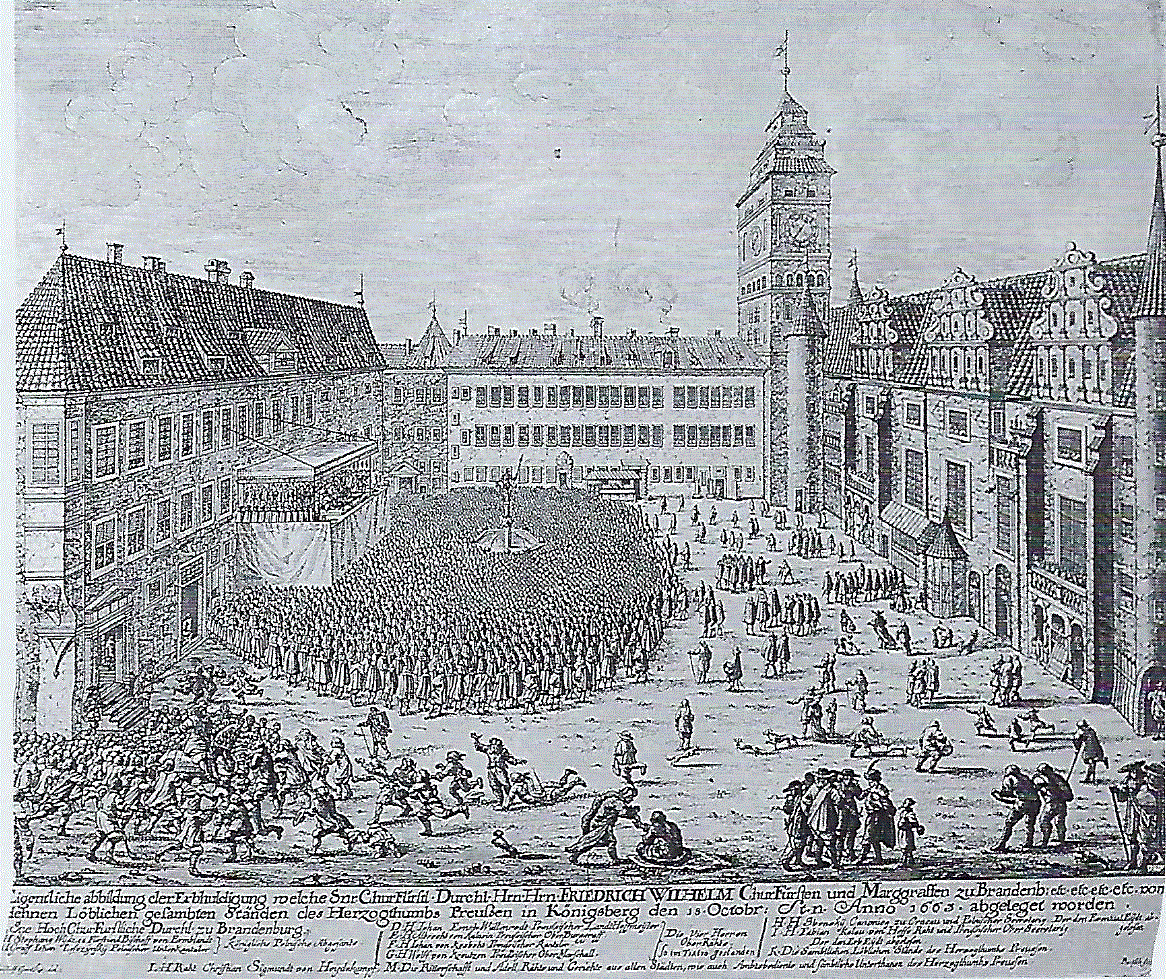
In 1663, the Prussian estates paid homage to Frederick William I of Brandenburg at Königsberg Castle.

In 1661 Frederick William informed the Prussian diet that he possessed jus supremi et absoluti domini, and that the Prussian Landtag could convene with his permission. The Königsberg burghers, led by Hieronymus Roth of Kneiphof, opposed "the Great Elector's" absolutist claims, and actively rejected the Treaties of Wehlau and Oliva, seeing Prussia as "indisputably contained within the territory of the Polish Crown". Delegations from the city's burghers went to the Polish king, John II Casimir Vasa, who initially promised aid, but then failed to follow through. The town's residents attacked the elector's troops while local Lutheran priests held masses for the Polish king and for the Polish–Lithuanian Commonwealth. However, Frederick William succeeded in imposing his authority after arriving with 3,000 troops in October 1662 and training his artillery on the town. Refusing to request mercy, Hieronymus Roth went to prison in Peitz until his death in 1678.

The Prussian estates, which swore fealty to Frederick William in Königsberg on 18 October 1663 refused the elector's requests for military funding, and Colonel Christian Ludwig von Kalckstein sought assistance from neighbouring Poland. After the elector's agents had abducted Kalckstein, he was executed in 1672. The Prussian estates' submission to Frederick William followed; in 1673 and 1674, the elector received taxes not granted by the estates and Königsberg received a garrison without the estates' consent. The economic and political weakening of Königsberg strengthened the power of the Junker nobility within Prussia.

Königsberg long remained a centre of Lutheran resistance to Calvinism within Brandenburg-Prussia; Frederick William forced the city to accept Calvinist citizens and property-holders in 1668.

=== Kingdom of Prussia ===
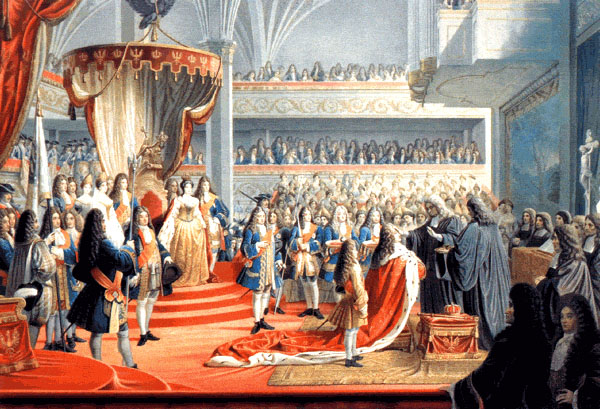
Coronation of Frederick I of Prussia in 1701

Coat of arms of Königsberg (first used as a seal from 1724; made the official armorial in 1906)

By the act of coronation in Königsberg Castle on 18 January 1701, Frederick William's son, Elector Frederick III, became Frederick I, King in Prussia. The elevation of the Duchy of Prussia to the Kingdom of Prussia was possible because the Hohenzollerns' authority in Prussia was independent of Poland and the Holy Roman Empire. Since "Kingdom of Prussia" was increasingly used to designate all of the Hohenzollern lands, former ducal Prussia became known as the Province of Prussia (1701–1773), with Königsberg as its capital. However, Berlin and Potsdam in Brandenburg were the main residences of the Prussian kings.

The city was wracked by plague and other illnesses from September 1709 to April 1710, losing 9,368 people, or roughly a quarter of its populace. On 13 June 1724, Altstadt, Kneiphof, and Löbenicht amalgamated to formally create the larger city Königsberg. Suburbs that subsequently were annexed to Königsberg include Sackheim, Rossgarten, and Tragheim.

=== Russian occupation ===
During the Seven Years' War (1756–1763), the Russian Empire entered the conflict against the Kingdom of Prussia with the aim of occupying East Prussia. Russian leaders considered incorporating the territory and later offering it to Poland as part of a broader territorial exchange desired by Russia.

Russian forces occupied Königsberg in January 1758 without resistance, and the Prussian estates pledged allegiance to the new authorities. The region experienced short-term economic growth during the occupation, supported by arms production for the Russian army and increased trade with the Polish–Lithuanian Commonwealth.

Under the terms of the Treaty of Saint Petersburg (5 May 1762), Russia renounced its claim to Königsberg, and the city returned to Prussian control.

=== Kingdom of Prussia after 1773 ===
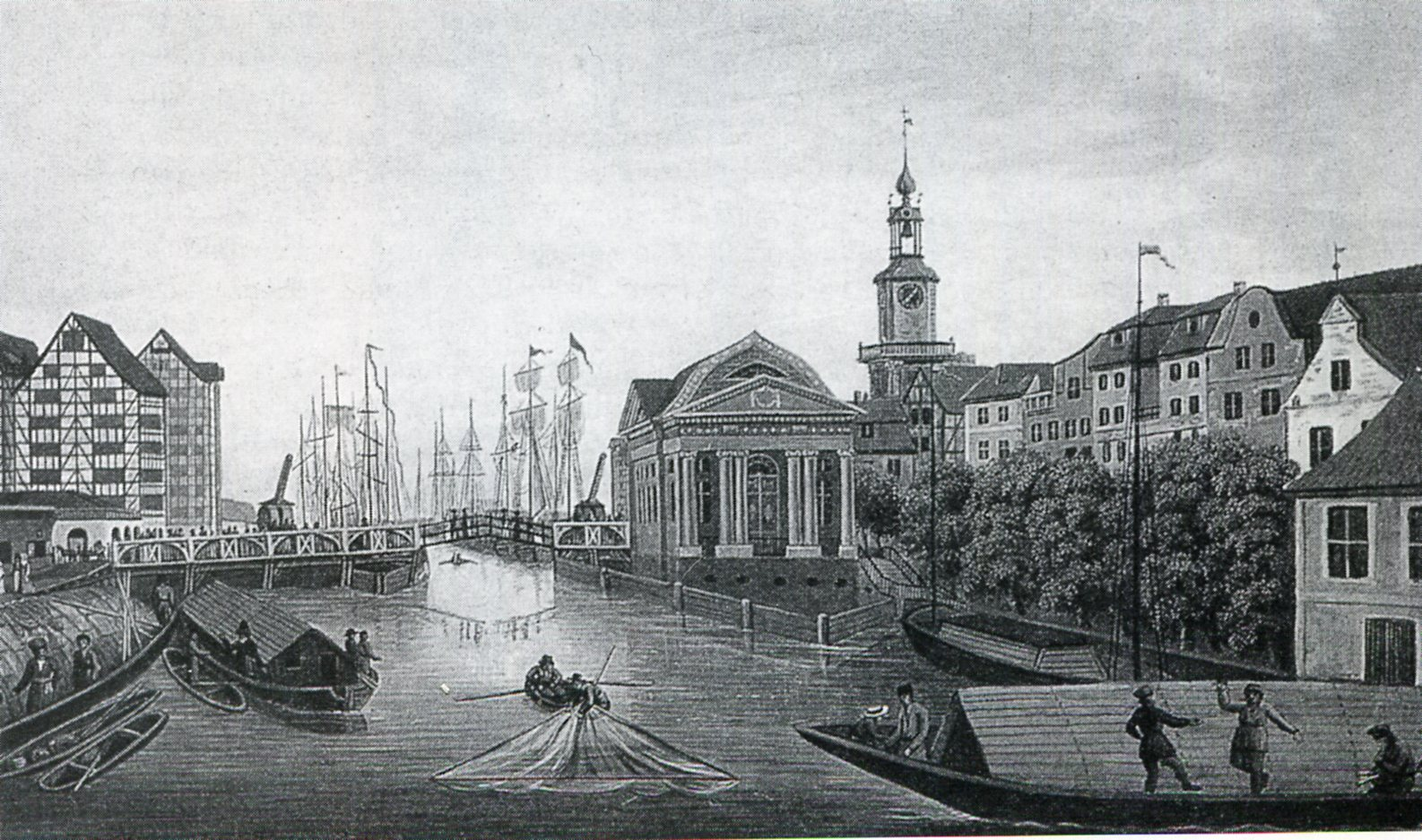
Königsberg in c. 1810

After the First Partition of Poland in 1772, Königsberg became the capital of the newly formed province of East Prussia, which replaced the Province of Prussia in 1773. From 1786 to 1791, it was the main port for grain exports from Lithuania. By 1800 the city was approximately five miles (8.0 km) in circumference and had 60,000 inhabitants, including a military garrison of 7,000, making it one of the most populous German cities of the time.

After Prussia's defeat at the hands of Napoleon Bonaparte in 1806 during the War of the Fourth Coalition and the subsequent occupation of Berlin, King Frederick William III of Prussia fled with his court from Berlin to Königsberg. The city was a centre for political resistance to Napoleon. To foster liberalism and nationalism among the Prussian middle class, the "League of Virtue" was founded in Königsberg in April 1808. The French forced its dissolution in December 1809, but its ideals were continued by the Turnbewegung of Friedrich Ludwig Jahn in Berlin. Königsberg officials, such as Johann Gottfried Frey, formulated much of Stein's 1808 Städteordnung, or new order for urban communities, which emphasised self-administration for Prussian towns. The East Prussian Landwehr was organised from the city after the Convention of Tauroggen.

In 1819, Königsberg had a population of 63,800. It served as the capital of the united Province of Prussia from 1824 to 1878, when East Prussia was merged with West Prussia. It was also the seat of the Regierungsbezirk Königsberg, an administrative subdivision.

Led by the provincial president Theodor von Schön and the Königsberger Volkszeitung newspaper, Königsberg was a stronghold of liberalism against the conservative government of King Frederick William IV. During the revolution of 1848, there were 21 episodes of public unrest in the city; major demonstrations were suppressed. Königsberg became part of the German Empire in 1871 during the Prussian-led unification of Germany. A sophisticated-for-its-time series of fortifications around the city that included fifteen forts was completed in 1888.

In 1862, the city became a centre of Polish preparations for a planned Polish uprising, and the Polish resistance imported weapons from abroad and smuggled them to the Russian Partition of Poland already before the uprising. During the January Uprising, the local Polish resistance imported weapons from France, England, Belgium and Germany, then smuggled them to the Russian Partition of Poland via Warmia, Masuria and Lithuania Minor. On 9 August and 22 August 1863, the Prussians seized weapons in the city that were intended for the insurgents. In the winter of 1863–1864, the city became one of the strongest centres of the Red Faction of the Polish insurrectionists.

The extensive Prussian Eastern Railway linked the city to Breslau (Wrocław), Thorn (Toruń), Insterburg, Eydtkuhnen, Tilsit, and Pillau. In 1860, the railway connecting Berlin with Saint Petersburg was completed and increased Königsberg's commerce. Extensive electric tramways were in operation by 1900; and regular steamers plied the waterways to Memel, Tapiau and Labiau, Cranz, Tilsit, and Danzig (Gdańsk). The completion of a canal to Pillau in 1901 increased the trade of Russian grain in Königsberg, but, like much of eastern Germany, the city's economy was generally in decline. The city was an important entrepôt for Scottish herring. In 1904, the export peaked at more than 322 thousand barrels. By 1900, the city's population had grown to 188,000, with a 9,000-strong military garrison. By 1914, Königsberg had a population of 246,000; Jews flourished in the culturally pluralistic city.

=== Weimar Republic ===
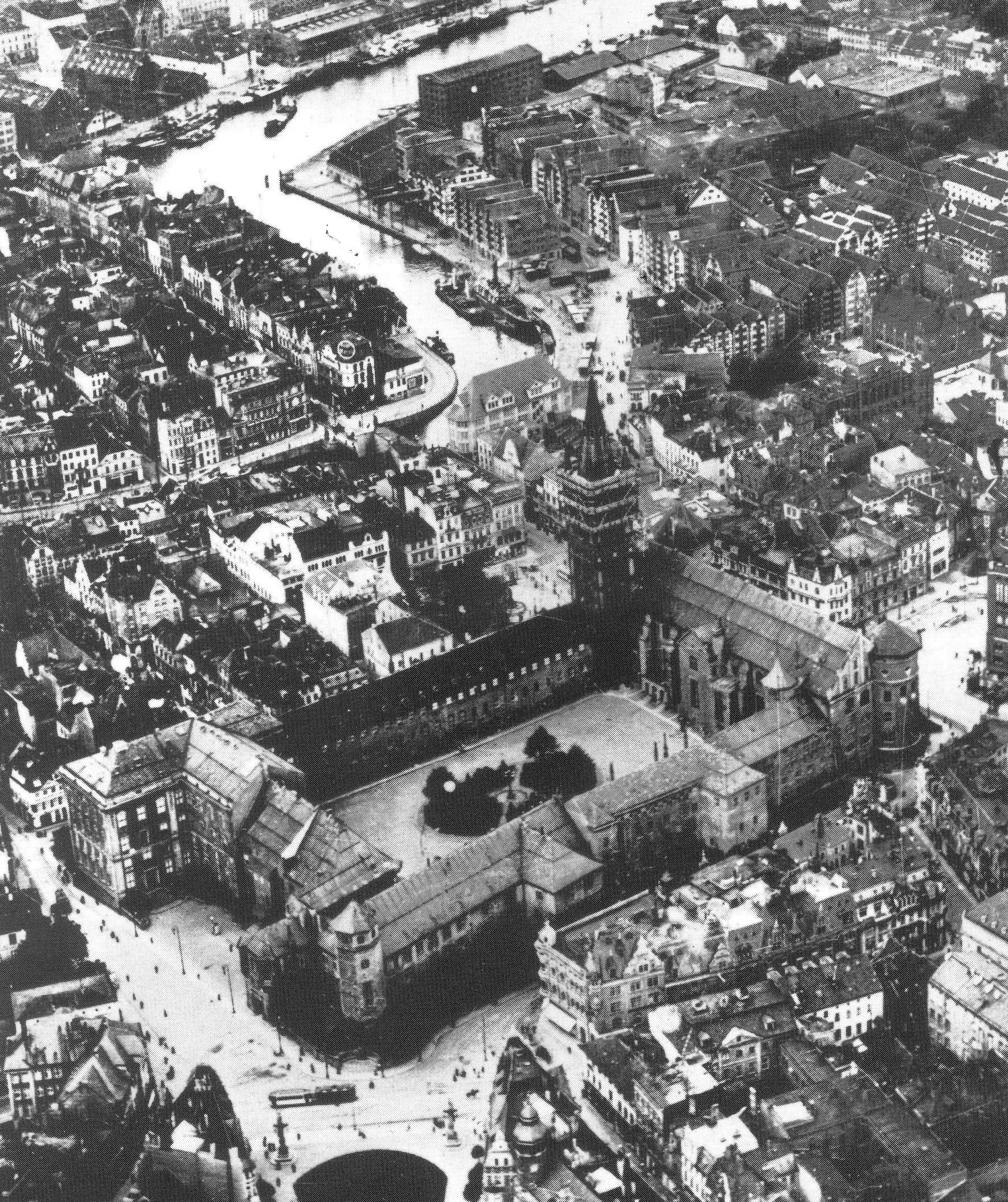
Aerial view of the Königsberg Castle and city centre during the interwar period

Following the defeat of the Central Powers in World War I, the German Empire was replaced by the Weimar Republic. The Kingdom of Prussia came to an end with the abdication of the Hohenzollern monarch, Wilhelm II, and was succeeded by the Free State of Prussia. On 9 November 1918, the day on which the Emperor's abdication was prematurrely announced and a republic proclaimed in Berlin, about 1,000 revolutionary soldiers in Königsberg freed political prisoners and occupied the city's military command centres, police headquarters, train station and telegraph offices. They then set up a soviet-style workers' and soldiers' council on the model of those that had been established across Germany following the outbreak of the revolution in Kiel.

Economic activity all but came to a halt. The council found it difficult to enforce its orders both in the city and across the rest of East Prussia. The Spartacist People's Navy Division was the greatest cause of concern. August Winnig, who was named East Prussia's Reich and State Commissioner with dictatorial powers on 22 January 1919, wrote later that "real power lay with a horde of deserting marines who had arrived in Königsberg in the first days of the revolution and had swelled in number to one and a half thousand men. At their head stood a committee of seven [. . . ] Relying on this force, the committee of seven ruled the city, and since it had generally subjugated the soldiers’ councils, it was also master of the province.” There was widespread fear that Russian Bolsheviks might take advantage of the disorder to occupy East Prussia. On 24 February 1919, a Königsberg People’s Defence Regiment was formed, and on 3–4 March it regained control of Königsberg from the Spartacists after heavy street fighting that left 22 dead and 53 wounded.

Königsberg and East Prussia were separated from the rest of Weimar Germany following the restoration of an independent Poland and the creation of the Polish Corridor under the terms of the Treaty of Versailles. Mass demonstrations were held in Königsberg following the announcement of the treaty's terms on 10 January 1920. Due to East Prussia's isolated geographical situation, the German government supported several large infrastructure projects. The Seedienst Ostpreußen (Sea Service East Prussia) was established in January 1920 to provide transport service to East Prussia that did not pass through Polish territory. In 1922 the world's first air terminal dedicated entirely to commercial aviation was opened at the Airport Devenau outside Königsberg. The Deutsche Ostmesse, a trade fair staged to spur East Prussia's economy, was held from 1920 to 1941. A rebuilt main train station opened in 1929 and the new North Station in 1930.

Even before the onset of the Great Depression in late 1929, East Prussia was facing a serious agricultural crisis. In 1930 Königsberg was the poorest major city in Germany; one-quarter of the city's population was receiving public assistance by 1932. With the economic collapse came increasing political radicalization. The Nazi Party, which in the 1925 and 1929 elections to East Prussia's Landtag won only 4% of the vote, achieved 58% in 1933.

=== Nazi Germany ===
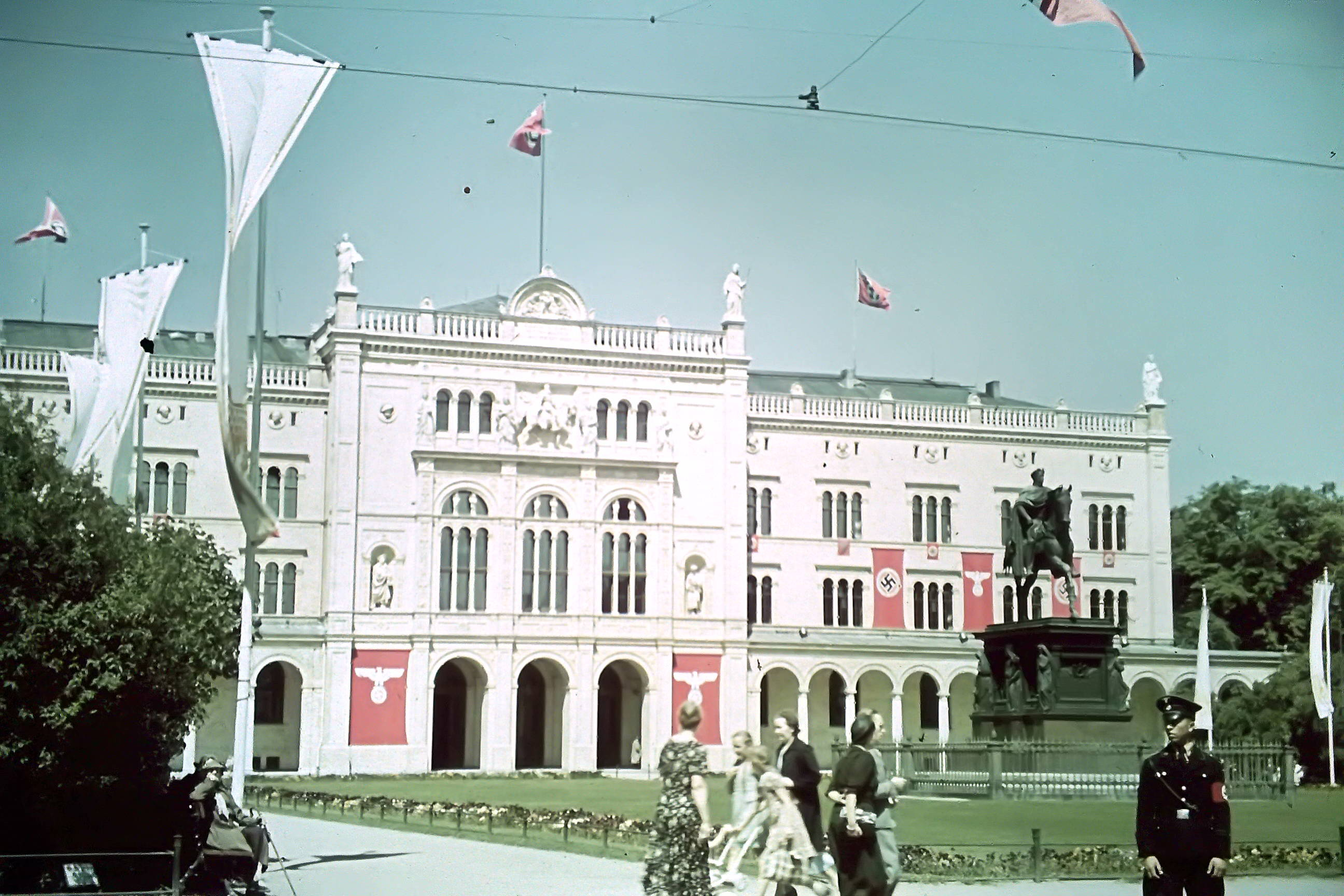
Königsberg in 1938

In 1932, the local paramilitary SA had already started to terrorise their political opponents. On the night of 31 July 1932, there was a bomb attack on the headquarters of the Social Democrats in Königsberg, the Otto-Braun-House. The Communist politician Gustav Sauf was killed, and the executive editor of the Social Democrat "Königsberger Volkszeitung", Otto Wyrgatsch, and the German People's Party politician Max von Bahrfeldt were severely injured. Members of the Reichsbanner were attacked and the local Reichsbanner Chairman of Lötzen (Giżycko), Kurt Kotzan, was murdered on 6 August 1932.

Following Adolf Hitler's coming to power, the Nazis confiscated Jewish shops and, as in the rest of Germany, a public book burning was organised, accompanied by antisemitic speeches in May 1933 at the Trommelplatz square. Street names and monuments of Jewish origin were removed, and signs such as "Jews are not welcome in hotels" started appearing. As part of the state-wide "Aryanisation" of the civil service, Jewish academics were ejected from the university.

In July 1934, Hitler made a speech in the city in front of 25,000 supporters. In 1933, the NSDAP alone received 54% of votes in the city. After the Nazis took power in Germany, opposition politicians were persecuted and newspapers were banned. The Otto-Braun-House was requisitioned and became the headquarters of the SA, which used the house to imprison and torture opponents. Walter Schütz, a communist member of the Reichstag, was murdered there. Many who would not co-operate with the rulers of Nazi Germany were sent to concentration camps and held prisoner there until their death or liberation.

In 1935, the Wehrmacht designated Königsberg as the Headquarters for Wehrkreis I (under the command of General der Artillerie Albert Wodrig), which took in all of East Prussia. According to the census of May 1939, Königsberg had a population of 372,164.

In World War II, both Königsberg and Berlin had large Fernschreibstellen (teleprinter offices) for the German Army, which collected morning messages each day from regional or local centres to be sent in long messages to headquarters. They also had a Geheimschreibstube or cypher room where plaintext messages could be encrypted on Lorenz SZ40/42 machines. If sent by radio rather than landline, they were intercepted and decrypted at Bletchley Park in England, where they were known as Fish. Some messages were daily returns, and some were between Hitler and his generals; both were valuable to Allied intelligence. Königsberg had links over the Eastern Front.

==== Persecution of Jews under the Nazi regime ====
Prior to the Nazi era, Königsberg was home to a third of East Prussia's 13,000 Jews. Under Nazi rule, the Polish and Jewish minorities were classified as Untermenschen and persecuted by the authorities. The city's Jewish population shrank from 3,200 in 1933 to 2,100 in October 1938. The New Synagogue of Königsberg, constructed in 1896, was destroyed during Kristallnacht (9 November 1938); 500 Jews soon fled the city.

After the Wannsee Conference of 20 January 1942, Königsberg's Jews began to be deported to various Nazi concentration camps: The SS sent the first and largest group of Jewish deportees, comprising 465 Jewish men, women and children, from Königsberg and East Prussia to the Maly Trostenets extermination camp near Minsk on 24 June 1942. Almost all were murdered soon after their arrival. Additional transports from Königsberg to the Theresienstadt Ghetto and Auschwitz took place until 1945.

In 1944–1945, the Germans operated a sub-camp of the Stutthof concentration camp in Königsberg, where they imprisoned around 500 Jews as forced labour. In 1939, the Germans also established a forced labour camp for Romani people in the city.

==== Persecution of Poles during World War II ====
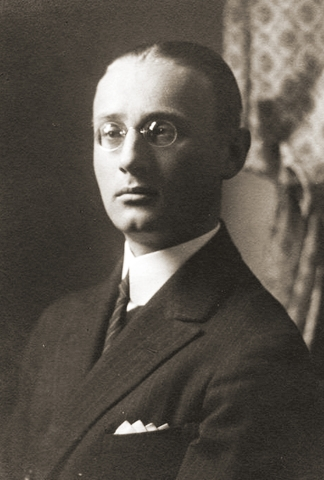
Jerzy Warchałowski, last pre-war Polish Consul General in Königsberg, arrested by Germany in 1939

In September 1939, with the German invasion of Poland underway, the Polish consulate in Königsberg was attacked (which constituted a violation of international law), its workers arrested and sent to concentration camps where several of them died. Polish students at the local university were captured, tortured and finally executed. Other victims included local Polish civilians guillotined for petty violations of German law and regulations, such as buying and selling meat. Nevertheless, the Polish resistance movement was active in the city, which served as one of the region's main transfer points for smuggled Polish underground press.

In September 1944, 69,000 slave labourers were registered in the city (not counting prisoners of war), with most of them working on the outskirts; within the city were 15,000 slave labourers. All of them were denied freedom of movement, forced to wear a "P" sign, if Poles, or "Ost" sign, if they were from the Soviet Union, and were watched by special units of the Gestapo and Wehrmacht. They were denied basic spiritual and physical needs and food, and suffered from famine and exhaustion. The conditions of the forced labour were described as "tragic", especially for Poles and Soviets, who were treated harshly by their German overseers. Ordered to paint German ships with toxic paints and chemicals, they were neither given gas masks nor was there any ventilation in facilities where they worked, supposedly to expedite construction, while the substances evaporated in temperatures as high as 40 °C. As a result, there were cases of sudden illness or death at work.

==== Destruction in World War II ====
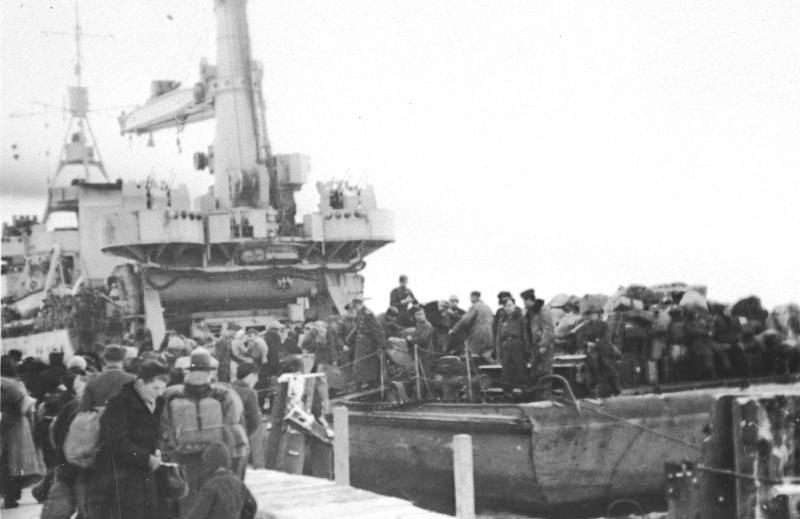
Refugees fleeing from Königsberg before the advancing Red Army in 1945

In 1944, Königsberg suffered heavy damage from British bombing attacks and burned for several days. The historic city centre, especially the original quarters Altstadt, Löbenicht, and Kneiphof, was destroyed, including the cathedral, the castle, all churches of the old city, the old and the new universities, and the old shipping quarters.

Many people fled from Königsberg ahead of the Red Army's advance after October 1944, particularly after word spread of the Soviet atrocities at Nemmersdorf. In early 1945, Soviet forces, under the command of the Polish-born Soviet Marshal Konstantin Rokossovsky, besieged the city that Hitler had envisaged as the home for a museum holding all the Germans had 'found in Russia'. In Operation Samland, General Baghramyan's 1st Baltic Front, now known as the Samland Group, captured Königsberg in April. Although Hitler had declared Königsberg an "invincible bastion of German spirit", the Soviets captured the city after a three-month-long siege. A temporary German breakout had allowed some of the remaining civilians to escape via train and naval evacuation from the nearby port of Pillau. Königsberg, which had been declared a "fortress" (Festung) by the Germans, was fanatically defended.

On 21 January, during the Red Army's East Prussian Offensive, mostly Polish and Hungarian Jews from Seerappen, Jesau, Heiligenbeil, Schippenbeil, and Gerdauen (subcamps of Stutthof concentration camp) were gathered in Königsberg by the Nazis. Up to 7,000 of them were forced on a death march to Sambia: those that survived were subsequently executed at Palmnicken.

On 9 April – one month before the end of the war in Europe – the German military commander of Königsberg, General Otto Lasch, surrendered the remnants of his forces, following the three-month-long siege by the Red Army. For this act, Lasch was condemned to death, in absentia, by Hitler. At the time of the surrender, military and civilian dead in the city were estimated at 42,000, with the Red Army claiming over 90,000 prisoners. Lasch's subterranean command bunker is preserved as a museum in today's Kaliningrad.

About 120,000 survivors remained in the ruins of the devastated city. The German civilians were held as forced labourers until 1946. Only the Lithuanians, a small minority of the pre-war population, were collectively allowed to stay. Between October 1947 and October 1948, about 100,000 Germans were forcibly moved to Germany. The remaining 20,000 German residents were expelled in 1949–1950.

According to Soviet documents, there were 140,114 German inhabitants in September 1945 in the region that later became the Kaliningrad Oblast, of whom 68,014 were in Königsberg. Between April 1947 and May 1951, according to Soviet documents, 102,407 were deported to the Soviet occupation zone of Germany. How many of the deportees were from the city of Königsberg does not become apparent from Soviet records. It is estimated that 43,617 Germans were in the city in the spring of 1946. According to German historian Andreas Kossert, there were about 100,000 to 126,000 German civilians in the city at the time of Soviet conquest, and of these, only 24,000 survived to be deported in 1947. Hunger accounted for 75% of the deaths, epidemics (especially typhoid fever) for 2.6% and violence for 15%, according to Kossert.

=== Soviet Kaliningrad ===
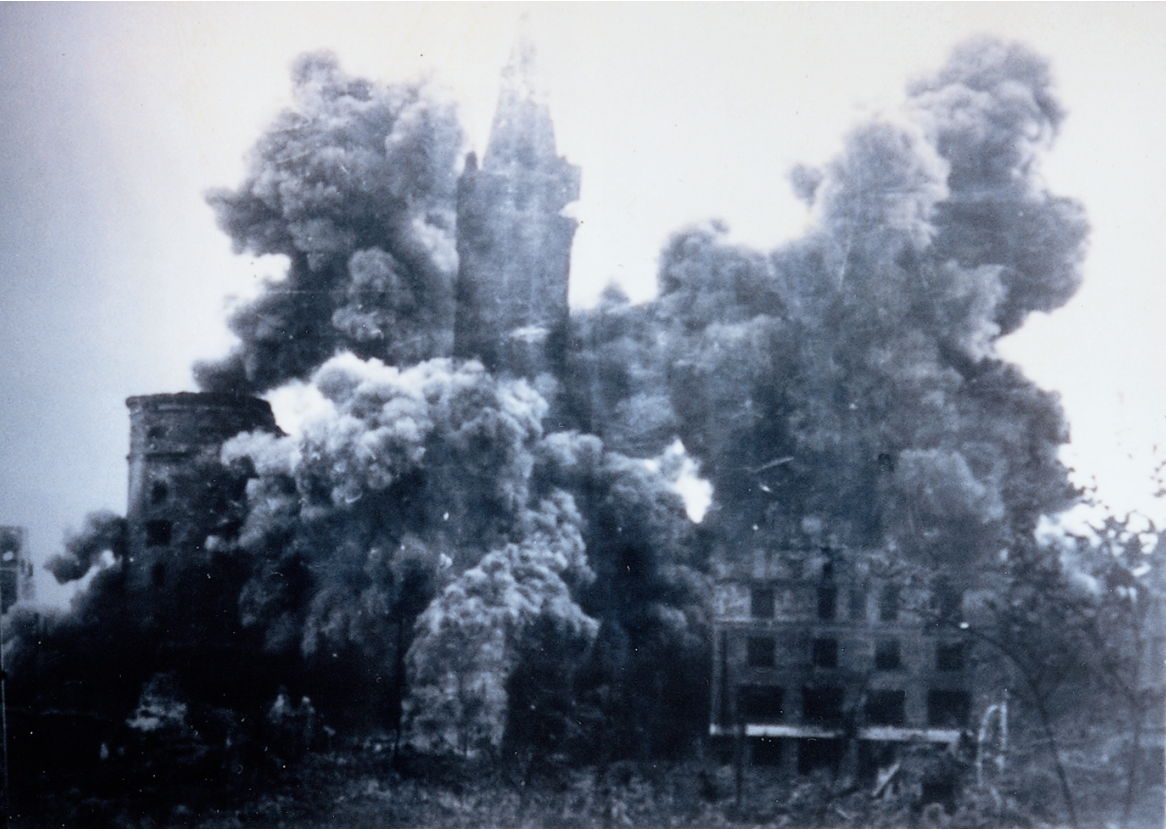
Demolition of the Königsberg Castle with explosives, 1959

Under the Potsdam Agreement of 1 August 1945, the city became part of the Soviet Union pending the final determination of territorial borders at an anticipated peace settlement. This final determination eventually took place on 12 September 1990 when the Treaty on the Final Settlement with Respect to Germany was signed. The excerpt from the initial agreement pertaining to the partition of East Prussia, including the area surrounding Königsberg, is as follows (note that Königsberg is spelled "Koenigsberg" in the original document):

VI. CITY OF KOENIGSBERG AND THE ADJACENT AREA
The Conference examined a proposal by the Soviet Government that pending the final determination of territorial questions at the peace settlement, the section of the western frontier of the Union of Soviet Socialist Republics which is adjacent to the Baltic Sea should pass from a point on the eastern shore of the Bay of Danzig to the east, north of Braunsberg – Goldep, to the meeting point of the frontiers of Lithuania, the Polish Republic and East Prussia. The Conference has agreed in principle to the proposal of the Soviet Government concerning the ultimate transfer to the Soviet Union of the city of Koenigsberg and the area adjacent to it as described above, subject to expert examination of the actual frontier. The President of the United States and the British Prime Minister supported the proposal of the Conference at the forthcoming peace settlement.

Königsberg was renamed Kaliningrad in 1946 after the Chairman of the Presidium of the Supreme Soviet of the USSR Mikhail Kalinin, although Kalinin was unrelated to the city, and there were already cities named in honour of Kalinin in the Soviet Union, namely Kalinin (now Tver) and Kaliningrad (now Korolev, Moscow Oblast).

Some historians speculate that it may have originally been offered to the Lithuanian SSR because the resolution from the conference specifies that Kaliningrad's border would be at the (pre-war) Lithuanian frontier. The remaining German population was forcibly expelled between 1947 and 1948. The annexed territory was populated with Soviet citizens, mostly ethnic Russians but to a lesser extent also Ukrainians and Belarusians.

The German language was replaced with the Russian language. In 1950, there were 1,165,000 inhabitants, which was only half the number of the pre-war population.

From 1953 to 1962, a monument to Stalin stood on Victory Square. In 1973, the town hall was turned into the House of Soviets. In 1975, the trolleybus was launched again. In 1980, a concert hall was opened in the building of the former Lutheran Church of the Holy Family. In 1986, the Kreuzkirche building was transferred to the Russian Orthodox Church.

For foreigners, the city was completely closed and, with the exception of rare visits of friendship from neighbouring Poland, it was practically not visited by foreigners.

The old city was not restored, and the ruins of the Königsberg Castle were demolished in the late 1960s, on Leonid Brezhnev's personal orders, despite the protests of architects, historians, local historians and ordinary residents of the city.

The "reconstruction" of the oblast, threatened by hunger in the immediate post-war years, was carried out through an ambitious policy of oceanic fishing with the creation of one of the main fishing harbours of the USSR in Kaliningrad city. Fishing not only fed the regional economy but also was a basis for social and scientific development, in particular, oceanography.

In 1957, an agreement was signed and later came into force, which delimited the border between Polish People's Republic (Soviet satellite state at the time) and the Soviet Union.

The region was added as a semi-exclave to the Russian SFSR; since 1946, it has been known as the Kaliningrad Oblast. According to some historians, Stalin created it as an oblast separate from the Lithuanian SSR because it further separated the Baltic states from the West. Others think that the reason was that the region was far too strategic for the USSR to leave it in the hands of another SSR other than the Russian one. The German names of the cities, towns, rivers, and other geographical features were changed to Russian names.

The area was administered by the planning committee of the Lithuanian SSR, although it had its own Communist Party committee. In the 1950s, Nikita Khrushchev offered the entire Kaliningrad Oblast to the Lithuanian SSR but Antanas Sniečkus refused to accept the territory because it would add at least a million ethnic Russians to Lithuania proper.

In 2010, the German magazine Der Spiegel published a report claiming that Kaliningrad had been offered to Germany in 1990 (against payment). The offer was not seriously considered by the West German government which, at the time, saw reunification with East Germany as a higher priority. However, this story was later denied by Mikhail Gorbachev.

== Demographics ==
Following the Christianisation of the region, the vast majority of the population was Catholic, and after the Reformation, the majority of the population belonged to the Evangelical Church of Prussia. A majority of its parishioners were Lutherans, although there were also Calvinists.

Number of inhabitants, by year

- 1400: 10,000
- 1663: 40,000
- 1819: 63,869
- 1840: 70,839
- 1855: 83,593
- 1871: 112,092
- 1880: 140,909
- 1890: 172,796
- 1900: 189,483 (including the military), among whom were 8,465 Roman Catholics and 3,975 Jews.
- 1905: 223,770, among whom were 10,320 Roman Catholics, 4,415 Jews and 425 Poles.
- 1910: 245,994
- 1919: 260,895
- 1925: 279,930, among whom were 13,330 Catholics, 4,050 Jews and approximately 6,000 others.
- 1933: 315,794
- 1939: 372,164
- 1945: 73,000

=== Jews ===
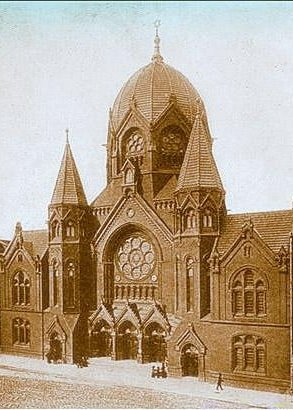
The New Synagogue, destroyed in the Kristallnacht in 1938

The Jewish community in the city had its origins in the 16th century, with the arrival of the first Jews in 1538. The first synagogue was built in 1756. A second, smaller synagogue, which served Orthodox Jews, was constructed later, eventually becoming the New Synagogue.

The Jewish population of Königsberg in the 18th century was fairly low, although this changed as restrictions became relaxed over the course of the 19th century. In 1756, there were 29 families of "protected Jews" in Königsberg, which increased to 57 by 1789. The total number of Jewish inhabitants was less than 500 in the middle of the 18th century, and around 800 by the end of it, out of a total population of almost 60,000 people.

The number of Jewish inhabitants peaked in 1880 at about 5,000, many of whom were migrants escaping pogroms in the Russian Empire. This number declined subsequently so that by 1933, when the Nazis took over, the city had about 3,200 Jews. As a result of antisemitism and persecution in the 1920s and 1930s, two-thirds of the city's Jews emigrated, mostly to the US and Great Britain. Those who remained were shipped by the Germans to concentration camps in two waves; first in 1938 to various camps in Germany, and the second in 1942 to the Theresienstadt concentration camp in occupied Czechoslovakia, Kaiserwald concentration camp in occupied Latvia, as well as camps in Minsk in the occupied Byelorussian Soviet Socialist Republic.

=== Lithuanians ===
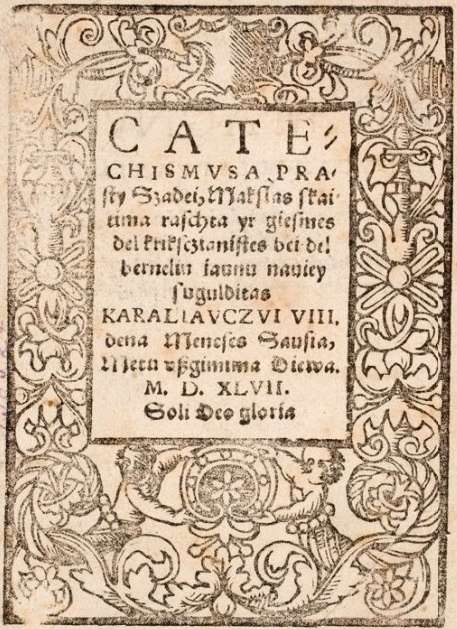
Catechism of Martynas Mažvydas, 1547

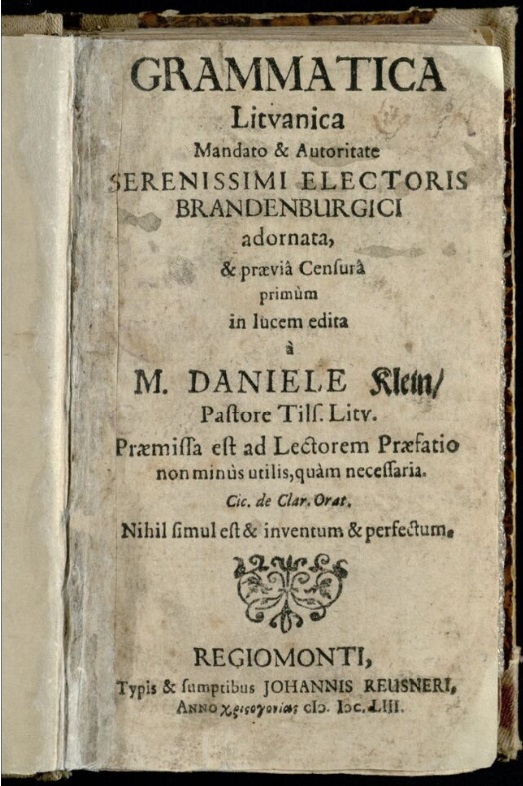
Grammatica Litvanica, 1653

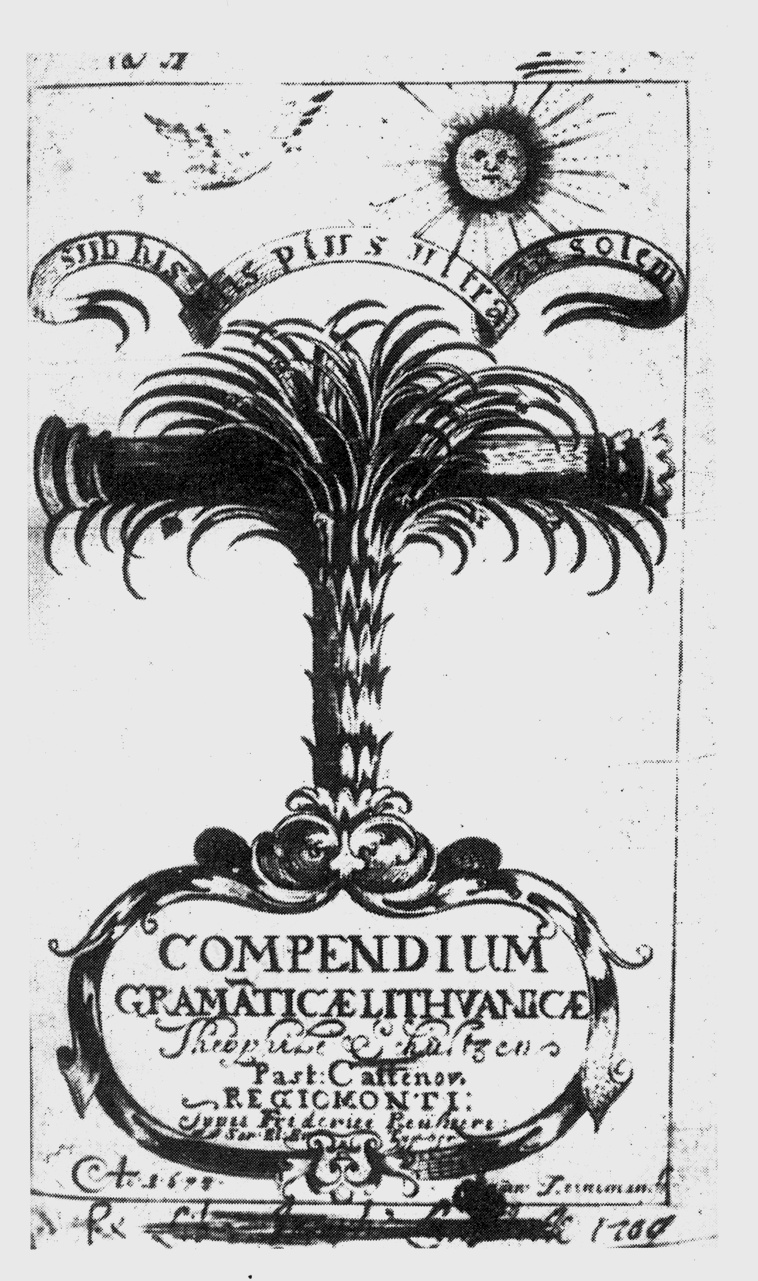
Compendium Grammaticae Lithvanicae, 1673

The Lithuanian Duke Butautas was baptised in Königsberg in 1365. In the 14th century Vytautas the Great was residing in Königsberg following his retreat from the Grand Duchy of Lithuania and 31 Samogitian nobles visited him in 1390 to recognize him as their ruler and concluded a peace and trade treaty. Lithuanians settled in the city since the 15th century. Lutheran Lithuanian church services were initially held in the St. Nicholas Church ("Polish Church"), and then moved to the Lutheran St. Elisabeth's Church ("Lithuanian Church"), whereas Catholic Lithuanian services were held in the Saint John the Baptist Church. Lithuanian church services at the Lithuanian Church was discontinued only in 1915.

The University of Königsberg was an important centre of Protestant Lithuanian culture and studies. Abraomas Kulvietis and Stanislovas Rapalionis are also seen as important early Lithuanian scholars, who also were one of the co-founders of the University of Königsberg. Later Lithuanian lecturers included Liudvikas Rėza and Frydrichas Kuršaitis. Students of the university included Jonas Šulcas, the author of the first book of fiction in Lithuanian (1706). There was a Lithuanian section at the local ethnographic museum in the early 20th century.

Königsberg was closely related to Lithuanian culture and had an important impact on founding the literary language and national press of Lithuania. Quite many Lithuanian publications were published by Königsberg's printing presses. The Catechism of Martynas Mažvydas, the first printed book in Lithuanian, was published in the city in 1547. The Polish-language book Kronika Polska, Litewska, Żmudzka, i wszystkiej Rusi ("Chronicle of Poland, Lithuania, Samogitia and all Rus") by Polish historian Maciej Stryjkowski, published in the city in 1582, is considered the first printed book on the history of Lithuania. Daniel Klein published the first Lithuanian grammar book in Königsberg in 1653. Local Lithuanian newspapers were Nusidavimai and Keleivis.

=== Poles ===
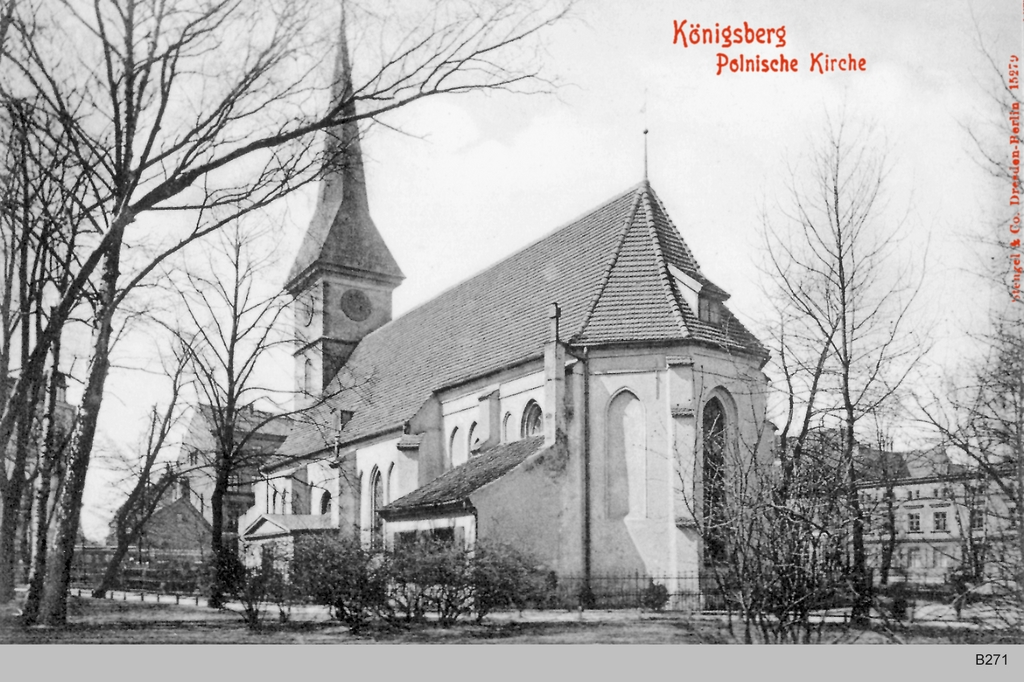
Steindamm Church, also known as the Polish Church, in 1908. It was heavily damaged by the Red Army and its ruins were demolished in 1950 by the Soviet government.

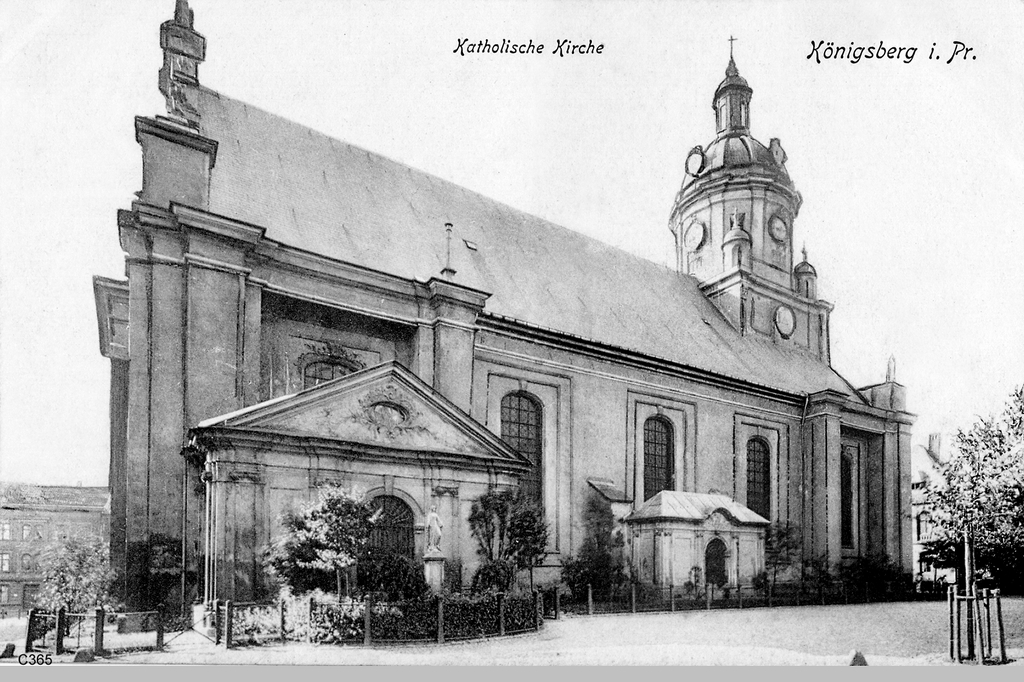
Catholic parish church

Polish settlement in the city dates back to the 14th century, and Kneiphof's (Polish: Knipawa) charter of 1327 permitted the settlement of Poles. One of the main streets was called Polnische Gasse (Polish Street) from 1436 until 1936, when it was renamed by the Nazis to erase traces of Polish presence. At peak, in the 17th-19th centuries, Polish church services were held at the same time in six churches: four Lutheran, one Catholic, and one Reformed. The city was the second largest centre of Polish printing after Kraków.

Poles were among the first professors of the University of Königsberg, which received the royal Law of Privilege from King Sigismund II Augustus of Poland on 28 March 1560. University of Königsberg lecturers included Hieronim Malecki (theology), Maciej Menius (astronomy) and Jan Mikulicz-Radecki (medicine). Jan Kochanowski and Stanislaw Sarnicki were among the first students known to be Polish, later Florian Ceynowa, Wojciech Kętrzynski and Julian Klaczko studied in Königsberg. For 24 years Celestyn Myślenta (who first registered at the University as "Polonus") was a seven time rector of the university, while Maciej Menius was a three times rector. From 1728, there was a "Polish Seminar" at the seminary of Protestant theology, which operated until the early 1930s and had developed a number of pastors, including Krzysztof Celestyn Mrongovius and August Grzybowski. Duke Albert of Prussia established a press in Königsberg that issued thousands of Polish pamphlets and religious books. During the Reformation, Königsberg became a place of refuge for Polish Protestant adherents, a training ground for Polish Protestant clergy and a source of Polish Protestant literature. In 1564, Jan Mączyński issued his Polish-Latin lexicon at Königsberg.

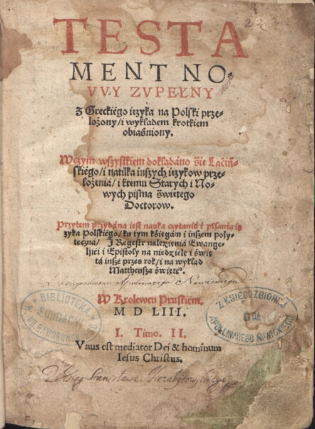
First Polish translation of the New Testament, by Stanisław Murzynowski, 1553

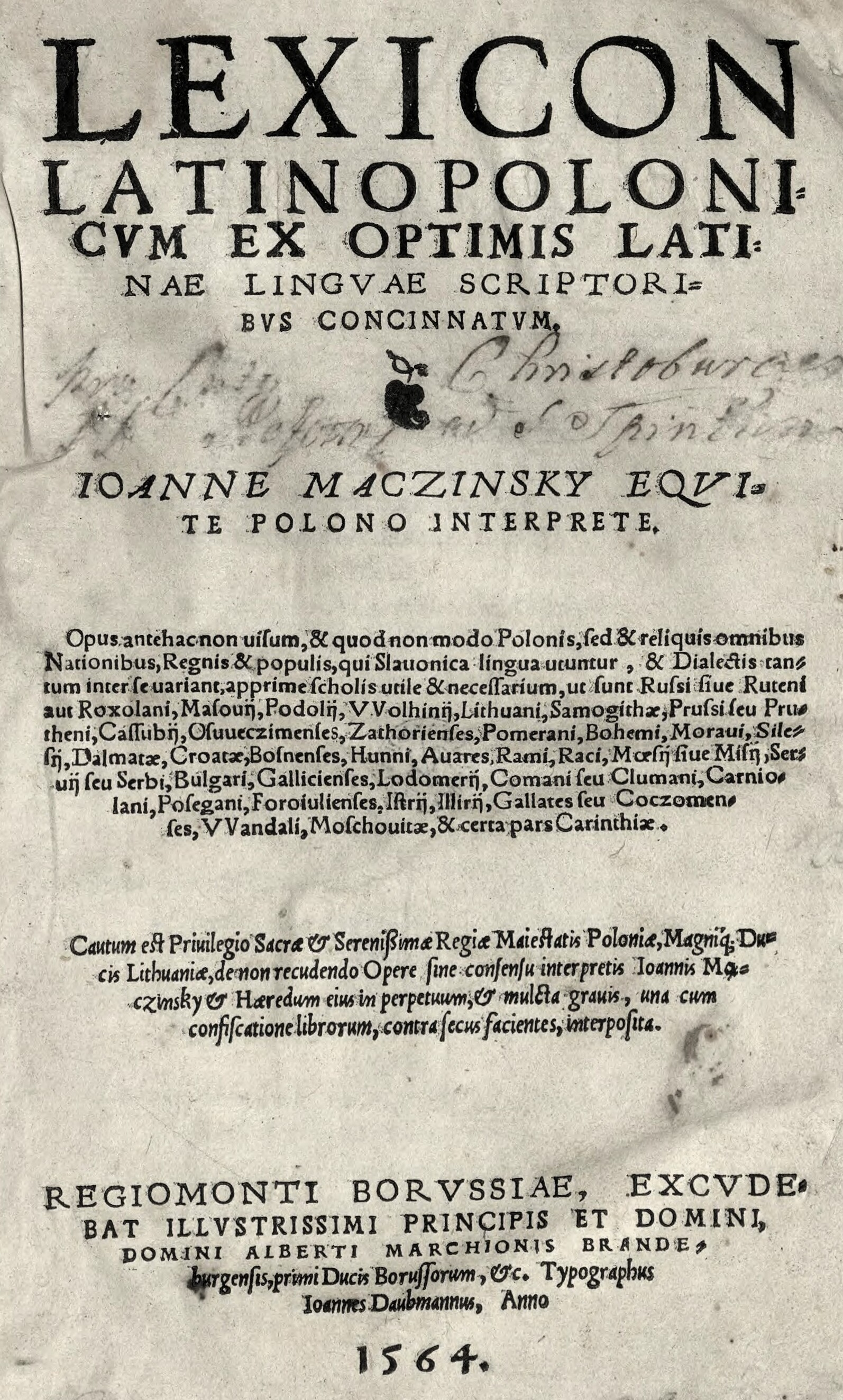
One of the oldest Latin-Polish dictionaries, by Jan Mączyński, 1564

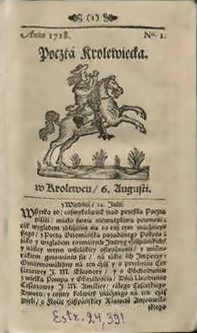
Poczta Królewiecka, the second oldest Polish newspaper, 1718

According to historian Janusz Jasiński, based on estimates obtained from the records of St. Nicholas's Church, during the 1530s, Lutheran Poles constituted about one quarter of the city population. This does not include Polish Catholics or Calvinists who did not have centralised places of worship until the 17th century, hence records that far back for these two groups are not available.

From the 16th to 20th centuries, the city was a publishing centre of Polish-language literature, especially religious literature. In 1545, in Königsberg, a Polish catechism was printed by Jan Seklucjan. In 1551, the first translation of the New Testament in Polish came out, issued by Stanisław Murzynowski. Murzynowski's collections of sermons were delivered by Eustachy Trepka and in 1574 by Hieronim Malecki. The works of Mikolaj Rej were printed here by Seklucjan. Maciej Stryjkowski announced in Königsberg the publication of his Kronika Polska, Litewska, Żmudzka, i wszystkiej Rusi ("A Chronicle of Poland, Lithuania, Samogitia and all Rus").

Although formally the relationship of these lands with Poland stopped at the end of the 17th century, in practice the Polish element in Königsberg played a significant role for the next century, until the outbreak of World War II. Before the second half of the 19th century, many municipal institutions (e.g. courts, magistrates) employed Polish translators, and there was a course in Polish at the university. Polish books were issued as well as magazines with the last one being the Kalendarz Staropruski Ewangelicki (Old Prussian Evangelical Calendar) issued between 1866 and 1931. In the 1840s, a local branch of the Polish Democratic Society was founded. The city played an important role in the January Uprising, as it was one of the main supply centres for the Polish underground movement, with about 10 companies of Königsberg smuggling arms and ammunition for Polish insurgents. There was a complex Polish resistance network built in the city, including figures such as Kazimierz Szulc and Piotr Drzewiecki. In 1876, Wojciech Kętrzyński wrote that the city retained a significant Polish community and the local population had pro-Polish sentiments, writing: "In Königsberg [...] a Pole among Germans today still finds sympathetic hearts, hearts that nourish sympathy for him". At that time, between 25 and 30% of the city's population was Polish.

During the Protestant Reformation, the oldest church in Königsberg, St. Nicholas, was opened for non-Germans, especially Lithuanians and Poles. Services for Lithuanians started in 1523, and by the mid-16th century also included ones for Poles. By 1603, it had become a solely Polish-language church as Lithuanian service was moved to St. Elizabeth. Until 1817, Lutheran Polish church services were also held in the Cathedral, Löbenicht Church and Altstadt Church. Catholic Polish services were held in the first post-Reformation Catholic parish church, built in 1614–1616 thanks to the efforts of King Sigismund III Vasa of Poland and the Polish Bishop of Warmia Szymon Rudnicki. The first Polish Reformed Church services were held in the city in 1655 at the castle, later moved to the Reformed school and Reformed church. In 1880, St. Nicholas was converted to a German-language church; weekly Polish services remained only for Masurians in the Prussian Army, although those were halted in 1901. The church was bombed in 1944, further damaged in 1945, and the remaining ruins were demolished after the war in 1950.

=== French ===
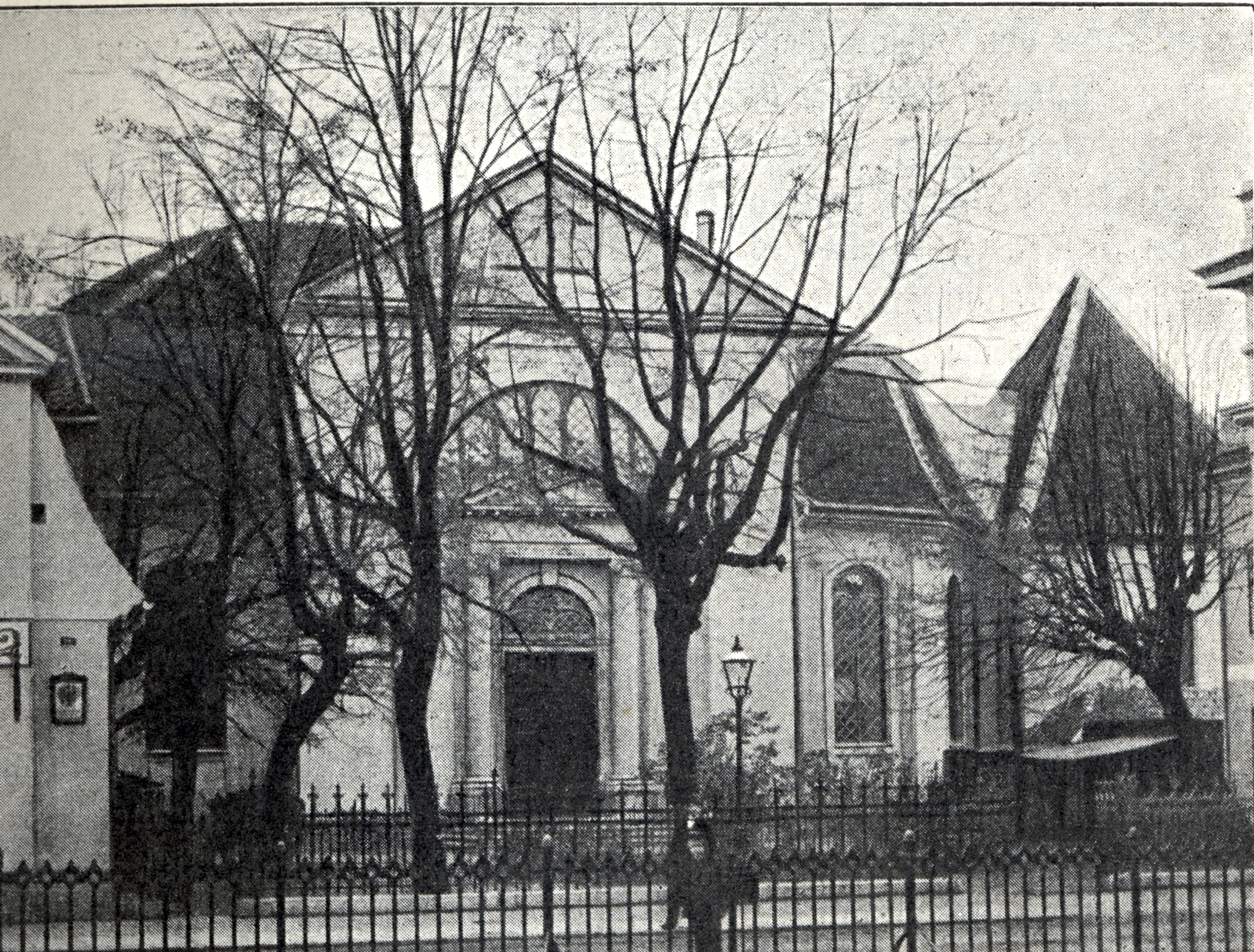
French Reformed Church

A French Huguenot community and congregation was founded in the city in 1686. The French Reformed Church was inaugurated in 1736, and the French Reformed preachers houses was built in 1740.

French church services were held until the 19th century. French Reformed secondary and elementary schools were closed in 1825 and 1832, respectively. The French Reformed Church was demolished in 1967.

== Culture and society ==
=== Notable people ===
Königsberg was the birthplace of the mathematician Christian Goldbach and the writer E.T.A. Hoffmann, as well as the home of the philosopher Immanuel Kant, who lived there virtually all his life and rarely travelled more than ten miles (16 km) away from the city. Kant entered the University of Königsberg at age 16 and was appointed to a chair in metaphysics there in 1770 at the age of 46. While working there, he published his Critique of Pure Reason (arguing that knowledge arises from the application of innate concepts to sensory experience) and his Metaphysics of Morals, which argues that virtue is acquired by the performance of duty for its own sake. In 1736, the Swiss mathematician Leonhard Euler used the arrangement of the city's bridges and islands as the basis for the Seven Bridges of Königsberg Problem, which led to the mathematical branches of topology and graph theory. In 1862, David Hilbert was baptised in Königsberg and educated there; he established himself as one of the world's most influential mathematicians by the turn of the century. Noted South African baboon rescuer Rita Miljo (1931–2012) grew up in Königsberg. The distinguished biochemist and Nobel prizewinner Fritz Lipmann (1899–1986) was born in Königsberg.

=== Languages ===
The language of government and high culture was German. The Low Prussian dialect was widely spoken, but is now a moribund language as its refugee speakers are elderly and dying out. As the capital of the region of East Prussia which was a multi-ethnic territory, diverse languages such as Latvian, Lithuanian, Polish, and Yiddish were commonly heard on the streets of Königsberg. Old Prussian, a Baltic language, died out in the 18th century.

=== Arts ===
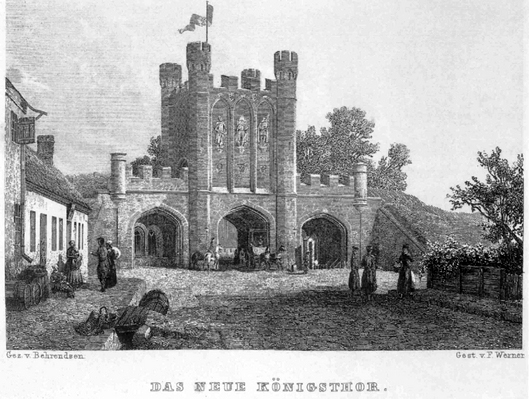
The King's Gate in the 19th century. It was restored in 2005.

In the Königsstraße (King Street) stood the Academy of Art with a collection of over 400 paintings. About 50 works were by Italian masters; some early Dutch paintings were also to be found there. At the King's Gate stood statues of King Ottakar I of Bohemia, Albert of Prussia, and Frederick I of Prussia. Königsberg had a magnificent Exchange (completed in 1875) with fine views of the harbour from the staircase. Along Bahnhofsstraße ("Station Street") were the offices of the famous Royal Amber Works – Samland was celebrated as the "Amber Coast". There was also an observatory fitted up by the astronomer Friedrich Bessel, a botanical garden, and a zoological museum. The "Physikalisch", near the Heumarkt, contained botanical and anthropological collections and prehistoric antiquities. Two large theatres built during the Wilhelmine era were the Stadttheater (municipal theatre) and the Apollo.

=== Königsberg Castle ===
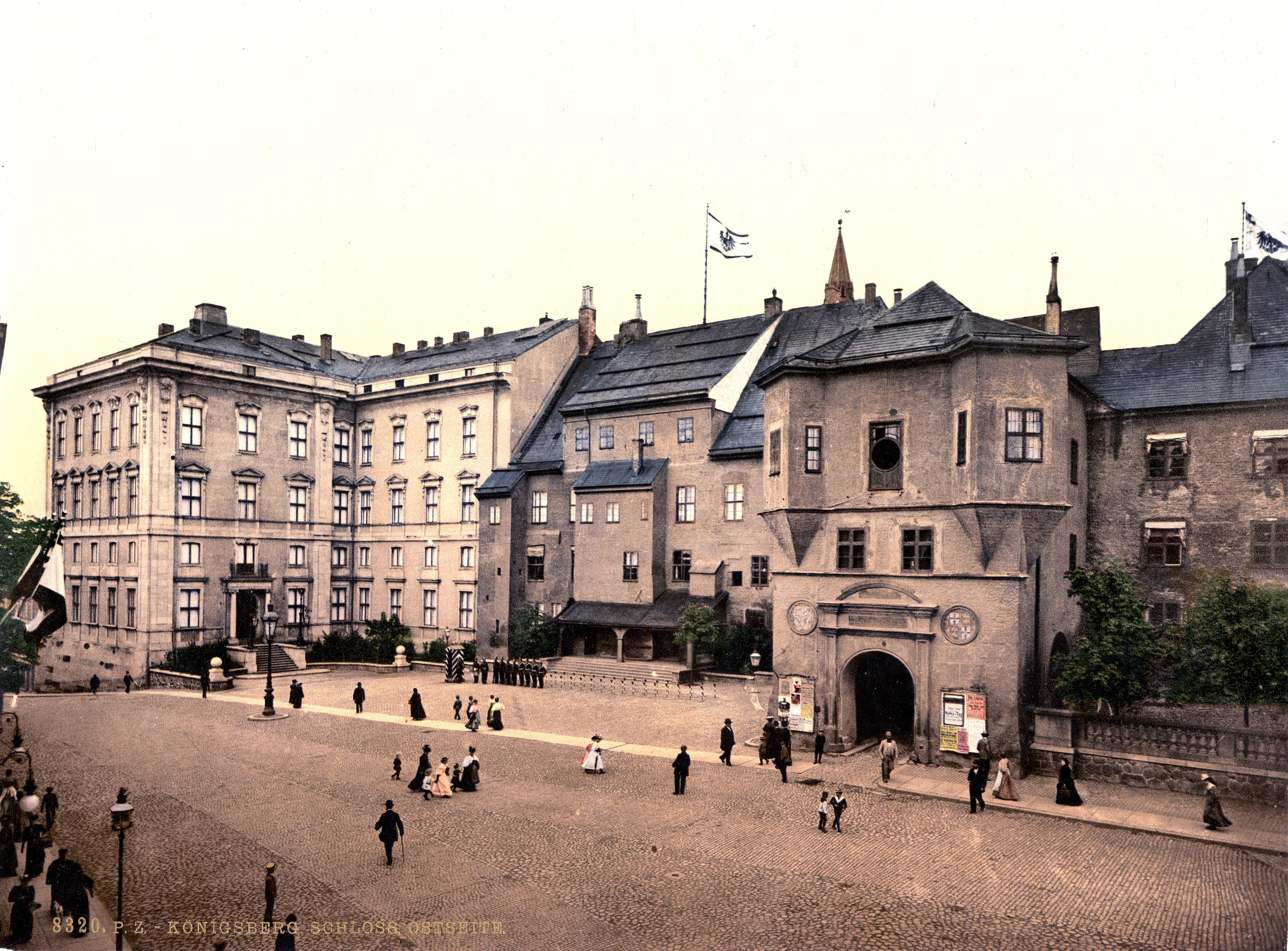
Eastern side of Königsberg Castle, c. 1900

Königsberg Castle was one of the city's most notable structures. The former seat of the Grand Masters of the Teutonic Knights and the Dukes of Prussia, it contained the Schloßkirche, or palace church, where Frederick I was crowned in 1701 and William I in 1861. It also contained the spacious Moscowiter-Saal, one of the largest halls in the German Reich, and a museum of Prussian history.

=== Education ===
Königsberg became a centre of education when the Albertina University was founded by Duke Albert of Prussia in 1544. The university was opposite the north and east sides of the Königsberg Cathedral. Lithuanian scholar Stanislovas Rapalionis, one of the founding fathers of the university, was the first professor of theology.

=== Multiculturalism ===
As a consequence of the Protestant Reformation, the 1525 and subsequent Prussian church orders called for providing religious literature in the languages spoken by the recipients. Duke Albrecht thus called in a Danzig (Gdańsk) book printer, Hans Weinreich, who was soon joined by other book printers, to publish Lutheran literature not only in German and (New) Latin, but also in Latvian, Lithuanian, Old Prussian and Polish. The expected readership were inhabitants of the duchy, religious refugees, Lutherans in Poland (including neighbouring Warmia) and Lithuania as well as Lutheran priests from Poland and Lithuania called in by the duke. Königsberg thus became a centre for printing German, Polish and Lithuanian books: In 1530, the first Polish translation of Luther's Small Catechism was published by Weinrich. In 1545, Weinreich published two Old Prussian editions of the catechism, which are the oldest printed and second-oldest books in that language after the handwritten 14th century "Elbing dictionary". The first Lithuanian-language book, Simple Words of Catechism by Martynas Mažvydas, was also printed in Königsberg, published by Weinreich in 1547. Further Polish- and Lithuanian-language religious and non-religious prints followed. One of the first newspapers in Polish was published in Königsberg in the years 1718–1720, the Poczta Królewiecka. The city remained an important Polish printing centre until the early 20th century, with the last Polish book printed in 1931.

=== Sports ===
Football clubs which played in Königsberg included VfB Königsberg and SV Prussia-Samland Königsberg. Lilli Henoch, the world record holder in the discus, shot put, and 4 × 100 meters relay events, was born in Königsberg, as was Eugen Sandow, dubbed the "father of modern bodybuilding". Segelclub RHE, Germany's oldest sailing club, was founded in Königsberg in 1855. The club still exists, and is now headquartered in Hamburg.

=== Cuisine ===
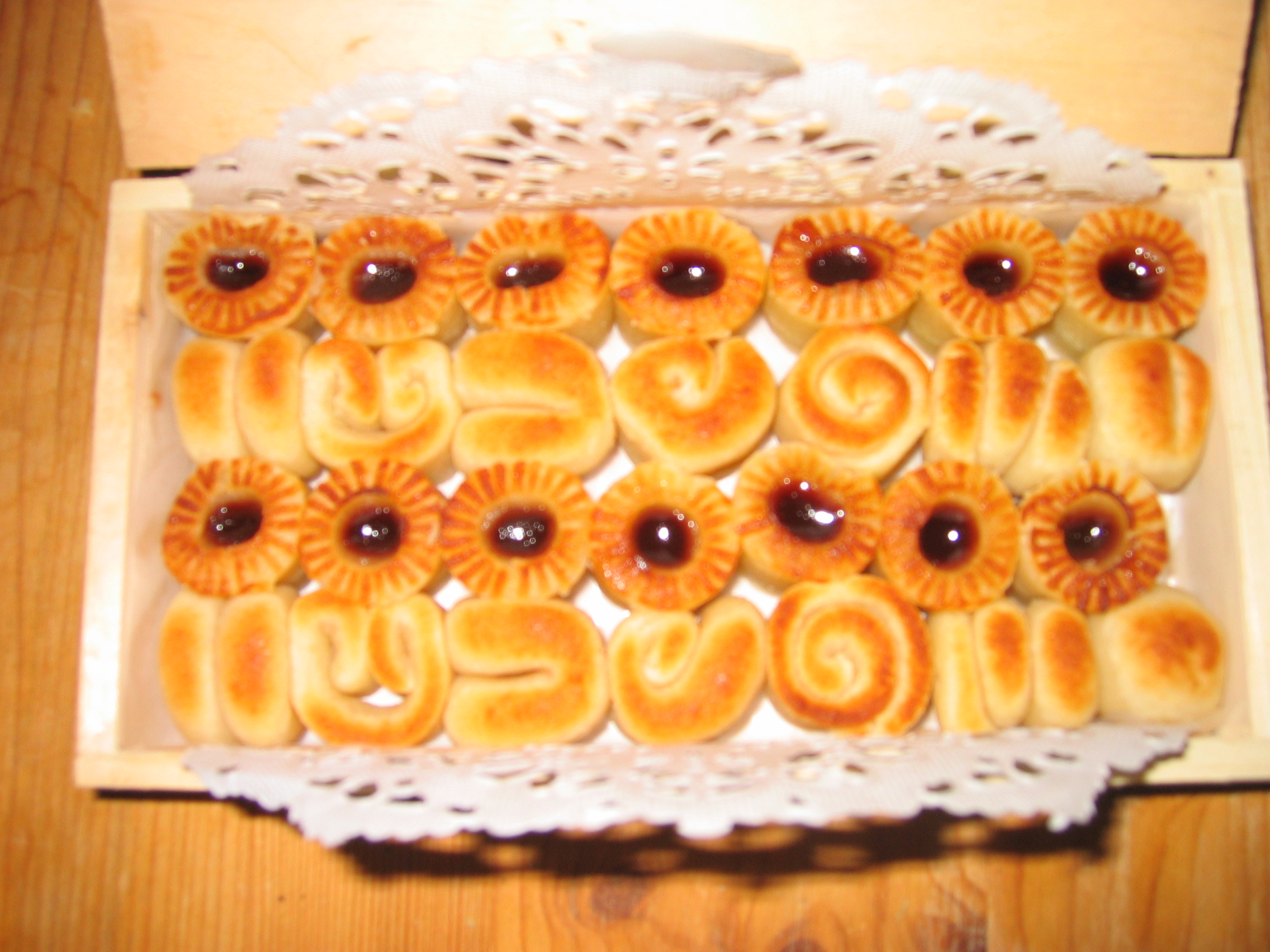
Königsberg-style marzipan

Königsberg was well known within Germany for its unique regional cuisine. A popular dish from the city was Königsberger Klopse, which is still made today in some specialist restaurants in the now Russian city and elsewhere in present-day Germany.

Other food and drink native to the city included:

- Königsberger Marzipan;
- Kopskiekelwein, a wine made from blackcurrants or redcurrants;
- Bärenfang;
- Ochsenblut, literally "ox blood", a champagne-burgundy cocktail mixed at the popular Blutgericht pub, which no longer exists (the pub was located in the north wing of Königsberg Castle, which was demolished in 1968);
- Königsberger Fleck or Königsberg-style tripe soup, made with the addition of bone marrow and root vegetables.

== Fortifications ==
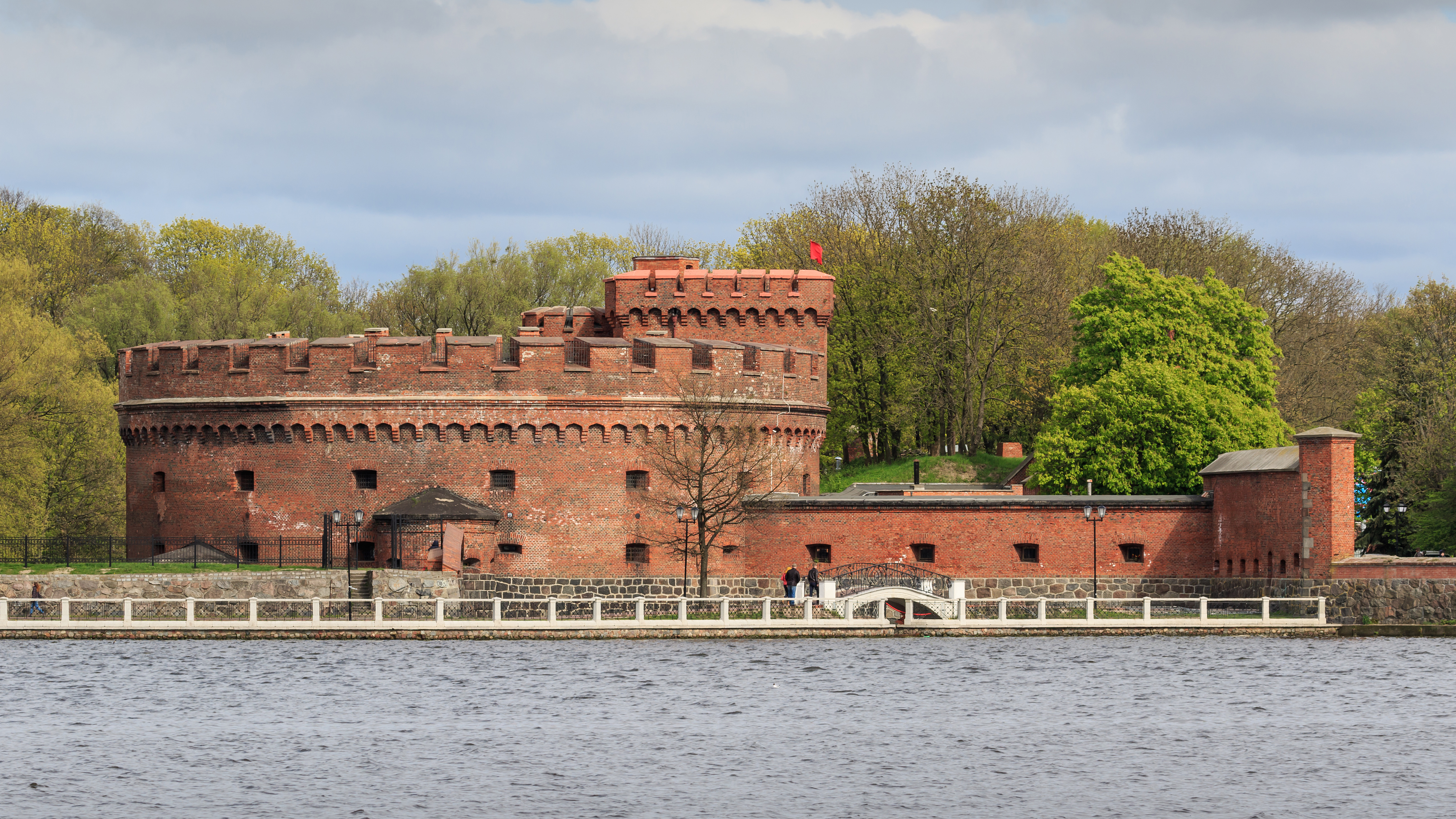
Dohna Tower, the last to surrender after the Soviet storming of Königsberg in 1945

The fortifications of Königsberg consist of numerous defensive walls, forts, bastions and other structures. They make up the First and the Second Defensive Belt, built in 1626–1634 and 1843–1859, respectively. The 15-metre-thick First Belt was erected due to Königsberg's vulnerability during the Polish–Swedish wars. The Second Belt was largely constructed on the place of the first one, which was in a bad condition. The new belt included twelve bastions, three ravelins, seven spoil banks and two fortresses, surrounded by water moat. Ten brick gates served as entrances and passages through defensive lines and were equipped with moveable bridges.

There was a Bismarck tower just outside Königsberg, on the Galtgarben, the highest point on the Sambian Peninsula. It was built in 1906 and destroyed by German troops sometime in January 1945 as the Soviets approached.

== See also ==
- List of people from Königsberg
- Königsberger Klopse, traditional German menu
- Königsberger Marzipan, traditional type of marzipan
- Seven Bridges of Königsberg, a topology problem
- Kaliningrad (Königsberg) question
- Königsberger Paukenhund, traditional kettle drum dog of the Prussian infantry
