= Jan Mączyński =

Polish humanist and lexicographer (c. 1520–c. 1587)

Jan Mączyński (c. 1520 – c. 1587) was a Polish humanist and lexicographer. He was appointed as canon of the Collegiate church in Kalisz. Mączyński was the author of a Polish-Latin Dictionary published around 1564 with 1000 pages and 20,500 Latin terms, including idioms and jargon, and their Polish equivalents.

Jan Mączyński (Macinius, Maczinsky) was born in Gzików, Poland in 1520. His father was Piotr Zajączek and his mother Anna née Ciemińska, but since his grandfather acquired the town of Mączniki, Jan was called "Mączyński".

== Academic career ==
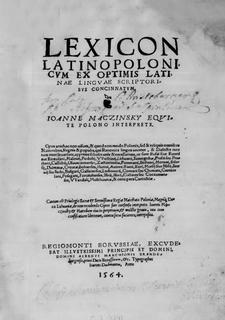
Cover page of Mączyński's Latin-Polish dictionary, published in 1564 in Królewiec

In 1540 Jan Mączyński became a student at the court of the bishop of Poznań, Sebastian Branicki, who also later funded Mączyński's travels and studies abroad. In 1543 he went to Wittenberg to study under Philip Melanchthon and later to Strasbourg where he was a student of Petrus Dasypodius a professor of Greek. At this time Mączyński was influenced by the Protestant Reformation and studied in Paris and at Zurich where he continued his studies under Heinrich Bullinger. In 1550 he was in Wittenberg as a friend of Lelio Sozzini. In 1551 he returned to Poland with a knowledge of Latin, Greek, and German and some knowledge of French, Italian and Hebrew. He then became a secretary to Voivode Mikołaj "the Black" Radziwiłł and a notary in the chancellery of the King of Poland in Wilno. In 1553 he was appointed as cannon of the Collegiate church in Kalisz and was offered the same position in Poznań, but did not take it. When Radzwiłł died, Mączynski settled in his home town, where he became a proponent of the Reformation. He was also at the Court of King of Poland Stefan Batory and became one of the Polish brethren (in Poland referred to as "Arians") though he did not support the movement's more radical social program. He represented Sieradz at the sejm in Lublin where the union between Poland and Lithuania was established. He also took part in the Synod of Bełżyce and the 1560 Sejm in Warsaw where, together with Andrzej Frycz Modrzewski, Mączyński argued for ecumenism and religious tolerance.

He died circa 1587 in the village of Miłkowice.

== Academic work ==
During his studies at Zurich Mączyński began work on a Polish-Latin Dictionary. In 1564 he moved to Königsberg (Królewiec) where he published his dictionary, which was later edited by Jan Sandecki-Malecki. The dictionary "Lexicon Latino Polonicum Ex optimis Latinae Linguae Scriptoribus Concinnatum” ran 1000 pages and contained 20,500 Latin terms, including idioms and jargon, and their Polish equivalents. In Poland the dictionary was considered an important contribution to classical studies and was referred to as the Mączyński Dictionary. The Polish poet, and Mączynski's contemporary and friend, Jan Kochanowski, wrote an epigram (in Polish a fraszka, a short satirical poem) about the dictionary. However, because only 500 copies were printed, the price of the dictionary was high, and the fact that Mączyński was a Protestant, the impact of the dictionary on the written Polish language was limited.

Mączyński may also have contributed Polish translation equivalents to the Basel edition of a dictionary issued in 1590 under the name of the Italian lexicographer Ambrogio Calepino.

== See also ==
- List of Poles

== Sources ==
- Aleksander Wojciech Mikołajczyk, ""Łacina w kulturze polskiej", seria "A to Polska właśnie", Wyd. Dolnośląskie, Wrocław 1998, ISBN 8373842152
- Bibliografia Literatury Polskiej – Nowy Korbut, t. 2 Piśmiennictwo Staropolskie, Państwowy Instytut Wydawniczy, Warszawa 1964, pp. 510–512
