= Gzików =

- Village
- Location within Poland
- Coordinates: 51°38′N 18°24′E
- Country: Poland
- Voivodeship: Łódź
- County: Sieradz
- Gmina: Błaszki

Gzików [ˈɡʑikuf] is a village in the administrative district of Gmina Błaszki, within Sieradz County, Łódź Voivodeship, in central Poland.

== Notable residents ==
- Jan Mączyński (c. 1520–c. 1587), humanist and lexicographer
