= Paradeplatz (Königsberg) =

Coordinates: 54°42′49″N 20°30′38″E

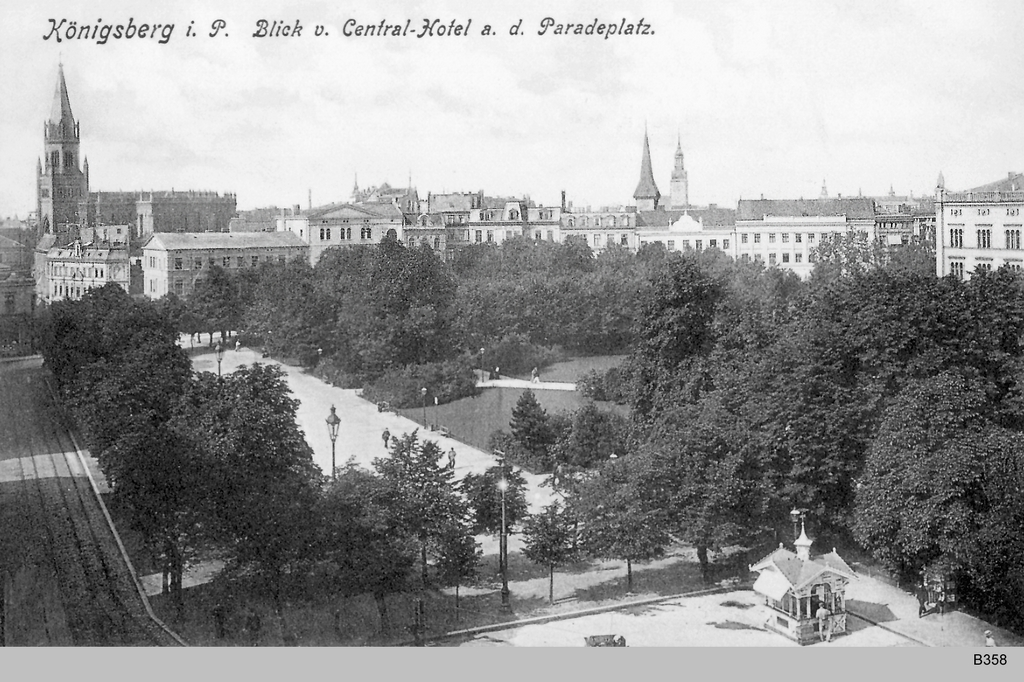
View southwest from the Central Hotel toward New Altstadt Church

Paradeplatz (parade square), also known as the Königsgarten (king's garden), was a park in Königsberg, Germany.

== History ==
In 1509 Grand Master Frederick of Saxony established land north of Königsberg Castle and Burgfreiheit and south of Tragheim as a garden; the original garden was larger than the 20th century park. It subsequently became the ducal pleasure garden after the establishment of the Duchy of Prussia in 1525. John Sigismund, heir to Brandenburg, married Anna of Prussia in the garden in 1594. Elector Frederick III honored Kanzler Georg Friedrich von Creytzen and Obermarschall von Wallenrodt among its old lime trees in 1697. It became a royal garden in 1701 with the formation of the Kingdom of Prussia. Much of the garden, which included foreign and specialty plants, froze during the unusually cold winter of 1708/09.

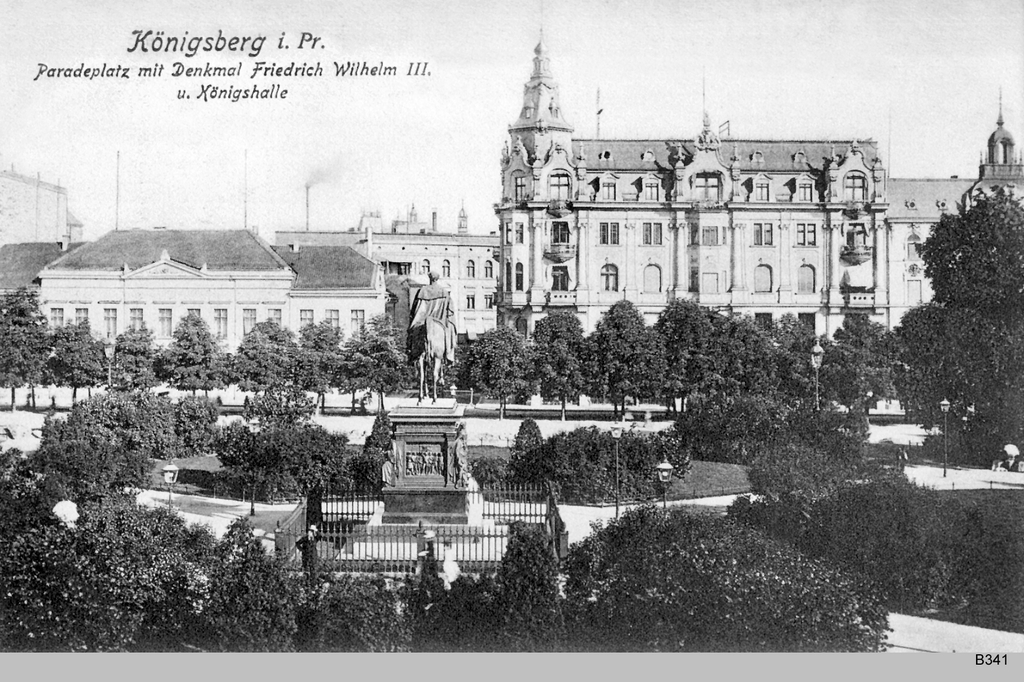
View southeast toward the Königshalle

King Frederick William I of Prussia (reigned 1713 to 1740), nicknamed the "Soldier-King", used the garden as a training ground for drilling troops. The architect Joachim Ludwig Schultheiß von Unfriedt began construction of a garrison church in the garden's northeast to replace the small church in Fort Friedrichsburg in 1731. Ludwig von Baczko considered the window-high building to be the most beautiful church in Königsberg, but the project was halted by King Frederick II (reigned 1740 to 1786). The classical Königshalle was built to the south in 1790, while a new building for military drills was constructed in 1791 along the northern side of the garden. Gauntlet punishments were held until 1808. Besides the common 18th century name Königsgarten, other historical names included Baumgarten, Fürstlicher Garten, Herzoglicher Garten, Hetzgarten, Lustgarten, Paradegarten, and Schloßgarten; in 1811 it was designated Paradeplatz.

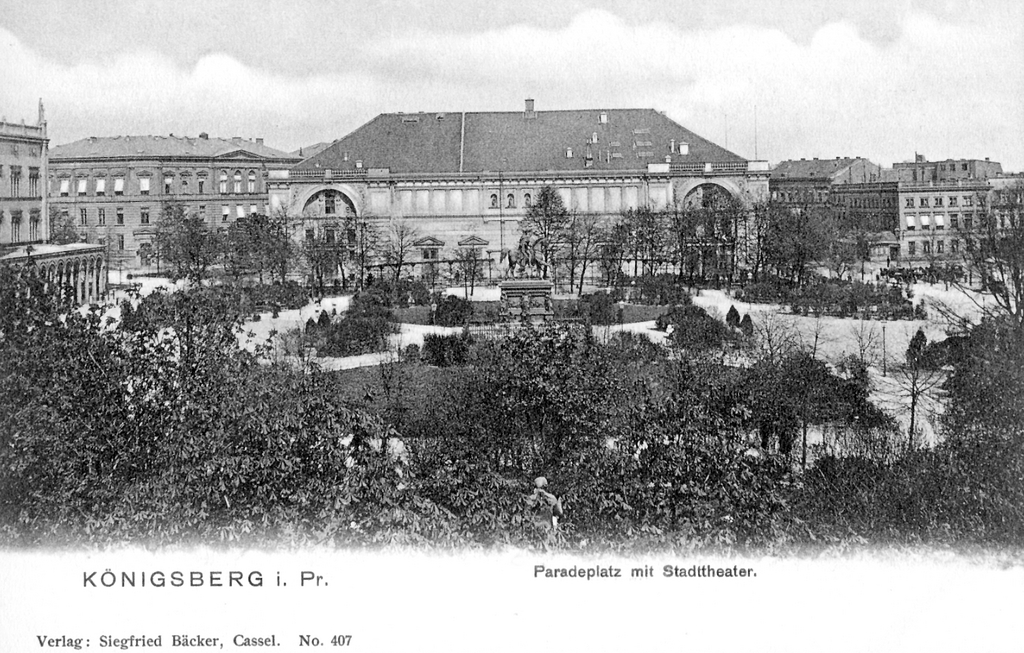
View northeast toward the Stadttheater

Under the direction of Minister Friedrich Leopold von Schrötter, construction of the Stadttheater began in 1806 in place of the former garrison church. Three years later King Frederick William III (reigned 1797 to 1840) transferred the garden from royal control to the city of Königsberg with the stipulation it not be developed. It subsequently developed into the fairest park of the city.

King Frederick William IV (reigned 1840-1861) laid the foundation stone for the Neue Albertina, the new campus of the University of Königsberg, along Paradeplatz's north in 1844; the new campus was dedicated in 1861. Military drills ended in 1848, allowing the park to often be used by actors. The Königshalle was used by royalists led by Lt. General Bernhard Joachim von Plehwe during the revolution of 1848.

The former drilling house was used as an exhibition hall by a polytechnical society in 1853 and subsequently dismantled. An equestrian statue of Frederick William III was installed by the campus on 3 August 1851, while the memorial to Immanuel Kant by Christian Daniel Rauch was moved from before the castle to the garden's southwest in 1885. Lines of chestnut and lime trees were planted along three sides of Paradeplatz, to which were also added lawns and lilac. Parades celebrating the birthday of Wilhelm II, German Emperor (reigned 1888 to 1918), were held in the park's south, while flea markets were held at Christmas time. Further horticultural development continued in 1920. Municipal authorities considered renamed the park Königsgarten again in 1884. Although they decided to keep it as Paradeplatz, the name Königsgarten continued in colloquial use.

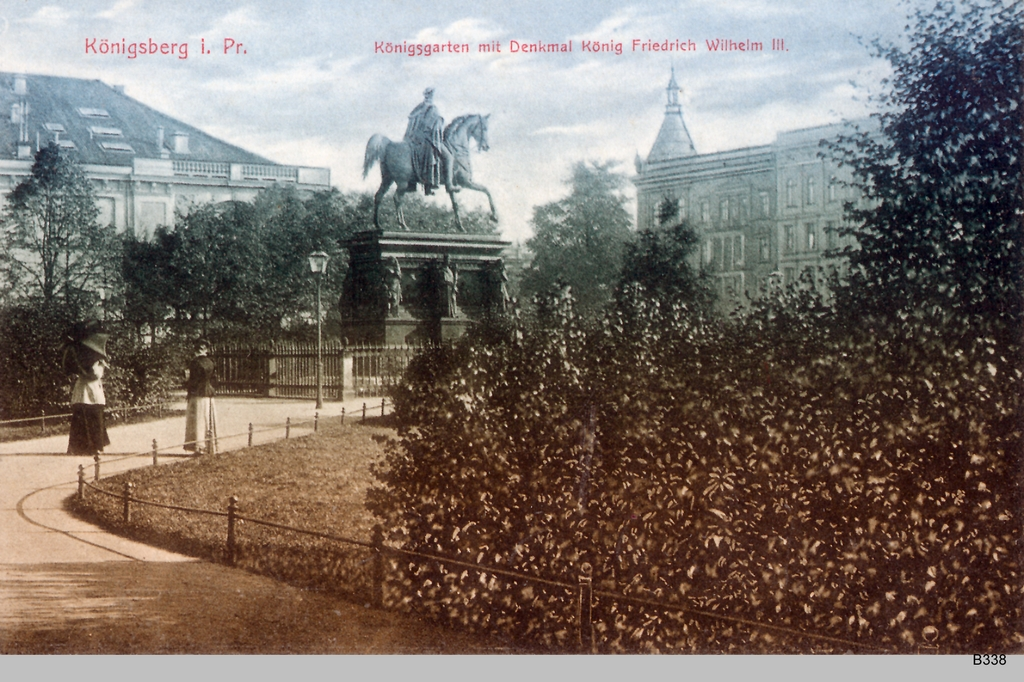
Monument to King Frederick William III of Prussia

The southern wooded avenue Kastanienallee was cleared in the 1930s and replaced with a large square, which allowed the city's trams to connect Steindamm and Tragheim. This square was also used as a parade route by the Nazis. In 1935 the Königshalle became a garrison mess.

Much of Paradeplatz, including the Königshalle and the Stadttheater, was destroyed during the 1944 Bombing of Königsberg in World War II. The Lasch Bunker, a military bunker constructed in the park in 1939, housed the staff of General Otto Lasch during the Battle of Königsberg. Lasch capitulated there to the Red Army on 9 April 1945. The former bunker is now used by the Kaliningrad Museum for History and Art. The former Neue Albertina campus is now used by Immanuel Kant Baltic Federal University.
