= Freiheit (Königsberg) =

A Freiheit (German for liberty or freedom; plural Freiheiten) was a quarter of medieval Königsberg, Prussia. All land surrounding Königsberg belonged to the Teutonic Knights, aside from specific tracts allocated to Königsberg's constituent towns or castle. The tracts, originally pastures and farmland, developed into suburbs subordinate in administrative, judicial, religious, and educational matters.

The Freiheiten of Königsberg Castle included Burgfreiheit, Neue Sorge, Rossgarten, Sackheim, and Tragheim. The highest authority over these suburbs was the castle's Oberburggraf. Altstadt's Freiheiten included Laak, Lastadie, Neurossgarten, and Steindamm. They were subordinate to the town council of Altstadt. The island town of Kneiphof controlled Vorstadt and Haberberg, while Löbenicht controlled only the small districts Anger and Stegen.

By the Rathäusliche Reglement of 13 June 1724, King Frederick William I of Prussia merged Altstadt, Löbenicht, Kneiphof, and their respective suburbs into the united city of Königsberg. Königsberg Castle and its suburbs remained separate until the Städteordnung of Stein on 19 November 1808 during the era of Prussian reforms.
