= Laak (Königsberg) =

Quarter of Königsberg, Germany

Coordinates: 54°42′26″N 20°30′15″E

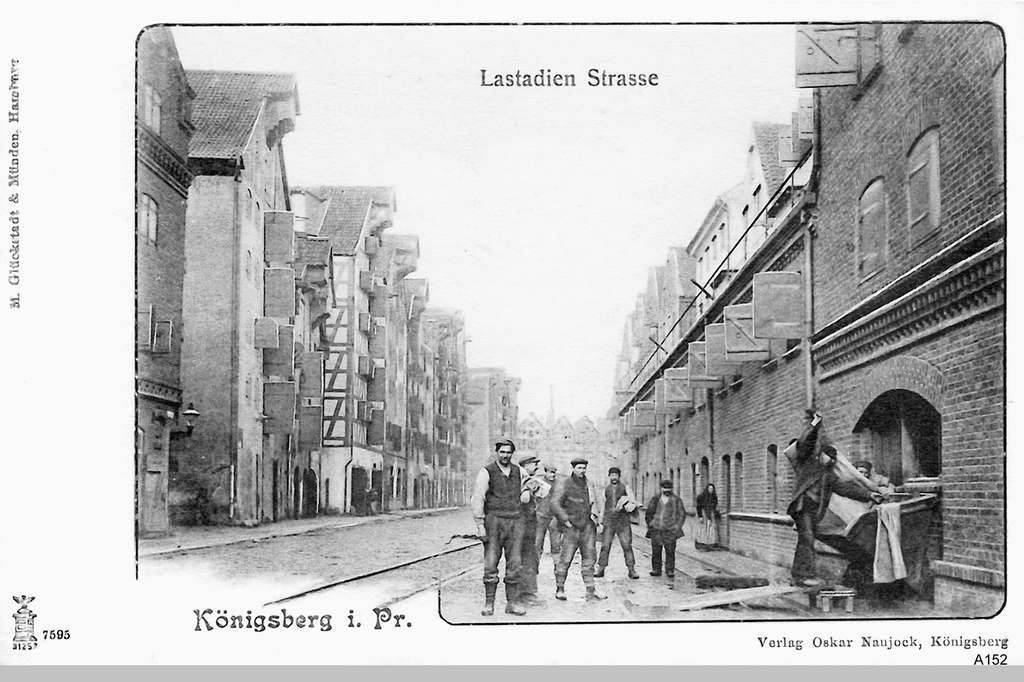

Laak was a quarter of western Königsberg, Germany. Its territory is now part of Kaliningrad, Russia.

== History ==
The name 'Laak' comes from an Old Prussian word meaning 'open field', 'marshland', or a 'brooklet'. This word is thought to refer to a waterway known as Lack/Lacke, which ran to the south of a later road named Laak.

Laak consisted of flat meadow land before becoming a medieval Freiheit suburb of Altstadt. Because of the wetness of the land, development of Laak was first concentrated to the north along the hill Rollberg before continuing to the west and south. Laak was bounded by Neurossgarten to the north, Altstadt to the east, Lastadie to the south, and the early 17th century Baroque city walls to the west. Beyond the walls were Kosse and Mittelhufen. Laak was closely affiliated with the Lastadie warehouse quarter and Lizent toll district.

By the Rathäusliche Reglement of 13 June 1724, King Frederick William I of Prussia merged Altstadt and Laak into the united city of Königsberg. Laak was heavily damaged by the 1944 Bombing of Königsberg and the 1945 Battle of Königsberg.

== Locations ==
Laak was divided into Unterlaak (Lower Laak) to the east and Oberlaak (Upper Laak) to the west. Unterlaak ran from the western end of Altstadt's Altstädtische Langgasse until Lizentgrabenstraße, while Oberlaak continued from Lizentgrabenstraße to Deutschordensring at the western city walls.

Unterlaak had a medieval ropewalk along Reifschlägergasse, and the city's fire department moved there in 1866. Also found in eastern Laak was the mercantile Markthalle. The Laakspeicherstraßen were three roads connecting Unterlaak to Lastadie.

Institutions in Oberlaak included the city employment office (Arbeitsamt), an anatomical institute (the Anatomie) of the University of Königsberg headed by Karl Friedrich Burdach in 1836, and a forensic institute (Gerichtsmedizinisches Institut) headed by Georg Puppe in 1903. The foundry Union Giesserei Königsberg was located between Oberlaak and Neuroßgarten's Botanischer Garten.
