= Kosse =

Kosse refers to:

- Kosse, Texas
- Kosse (Königsberg)
