= Aweyden =

Aweyden may refer to:

- the German name of Nawiady, Poland
- Aweiden, former quarter of Königsberg, Prussia
