= Burgfreiheit =

Coordinates: 54°42′49″N 20°30′55″E

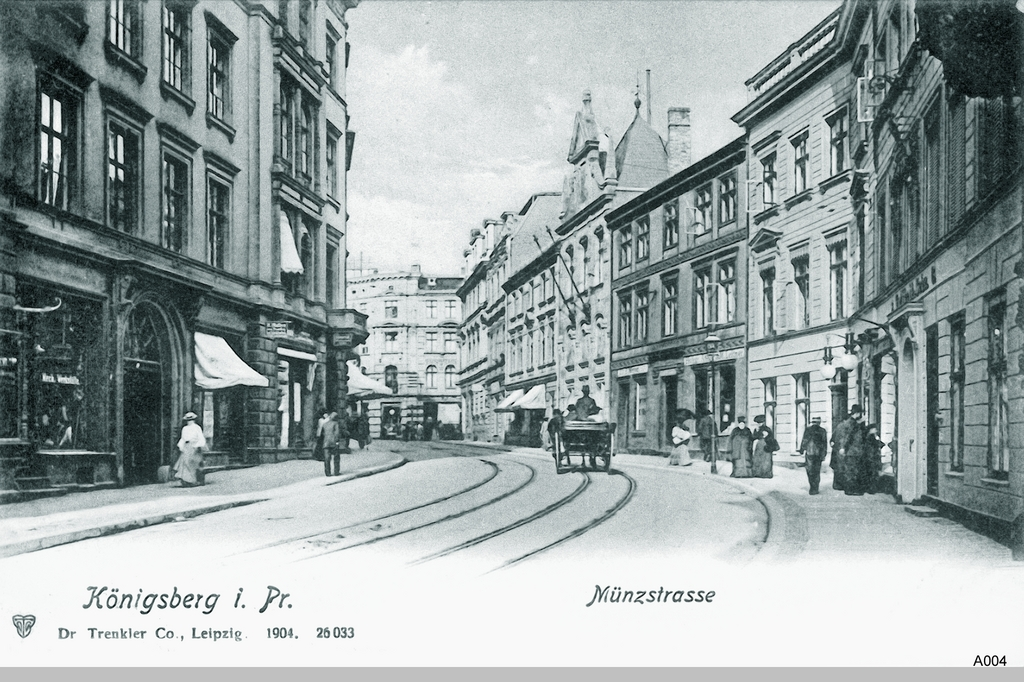
Münzstraße

Burgfreiheit or Schlossfreiheit was a quarter of Königsberg, Germany. Its territory is now part of Kaliningrad, Russia.

== History ==
Burgfreiheit extended north of Königsberg Castle on both sides of the Schlossteich, and was outside of Königsberg's three constituent towns, Altstadt, Löbenicht, and Kneiphof. Bordering quarters were Steindamm to the west, Tragheim to the north, Rossgarten to the northeast, Neue Sorge to the east, Löbenicht to the southeast, and the castle to the south.

Documented in 1255, Burgfreiheit was inhabited by noble officials and craftsmen in the vicinity of the Teutonic Knights' castle (Burg). It was one of the castle's Freiheiten, suburbs with special rights. During the Teutonic era, Burgfreiheit also included mills, a court, the servants' infirmary, and two churches. Ca. 1500 it was defended by city walls. During the ducal era, it fell under the jurisdiction of the Oberburggraf residing in the castle.

Most of Königsberg's Reformed adherents lived in Burgfreiheit; the Burgkirche was constructed in the 1690s. Reformed students attended the Burgschule school. In 1680 or 1682 Frederick William, the Great Elector, allowed the city's Jewish residents to rent space for prayer at the Eulenburgsches Haus (later Hotel Deutsches Haus) on Burgfreiheit's Kehrwiederstraße (later Theaterstraße).

In 1701 the mostly Protestant burghers of Burgfreiheit petitioned the newly crowned King Frederick I to raise the district to the status of a proposed fourth town known as Friedrich(s)stadt or König(s)stadt. They also requested a coat of arms depicting a hand descending from the heavens holding a crown, flanked by a star and a blue cross; the imagery was taken from Frederick's Order of the Black Eagle. The burghers' petitions were defeated by opposition from the other three towns' councils and a bribe of 200 ducats from Wartenberg.

Altstadt, Löbenicht, Kneiphof, and their respective suburbs were merged to form the united city of Königsberg in 1724. However, Königsberg Castle and its suburbs, including Burgfreiheit, were included within the new city limits but remained under royal, not municipal, control. Burgfreiheit was finally merged into the city during the Städteordnung of Stein on 19 November 1808 during the era of Prussian reforms. After recognizing the reorganization, King Frederick William III relinquished Burgfreiheit from crown land on 4 November 1809.

Burgfreiheit was heavily damaged by the 1944 Bombing of Königsberg and 1945 Battle of Königsberg. Buildings which survived World War II were subsequently demolished by the Soviet Union.

== Places ==
Streets and squares in Burgfreiheit included:

- Münzplatz, where the mint was located, and Münzstraße
- Junkerstraße, where court attendants and Junkers lived
- Theaterstraße, formerly known as Kehrwiederstraße and once derogatorily known as Arschkerbe because of its street gutter
- Französische Straße, formerly Burggasse, where many French Huguenot refugees allegedly settled after the Edict of Nantes
- Burgkirchenplatz, which included the Protestant Burgkirche
- Paradeplatz and the Königsgarten
- Kasernengasse, formerly Stallengasse, where courtiers were granted stables
- Prinzessinstraße (later part of Kantstraße), where court ladies resided
