= Rzhevskoye Microdistrict =

Residential area in Kaliningrad, Russia

Coordinates: 54.6833°N 20.5944°E

Rzhevskoye (Russian: Ржевское) is a residential area in Moskovsky District of the city of Kaliningrad, Russia. It was formerly known by its German language names Adlig Neuendorf or simply Neuendorf as first a suburb of and then a quarter of Königsberg, Germany, located east of the city center and south of the Pregel.

== History ==
For its loyalty to the Teutonic Knights during the Thirteen Years' War, Altstadt was granted the village of Neuendorf in 1466. Neuendorf Church was constructed during the era of the Teutonic Knights. Neuendorf grew to reach the Alter Pregel and a pond, the Mühlenteich. The fort XII Eulenburg, part of the Königsberg fortifications, was constructed near Neuendorf from 1872 to 1874.

A pumping station was built in Neuendorf in 1928 to improve the water supply for Königsberg. The estate was incorporated into Königsberg in 1939. Nearby quarters were Jerusalem to the west and Seligenfeld to the southwest.
