= Lastadie =

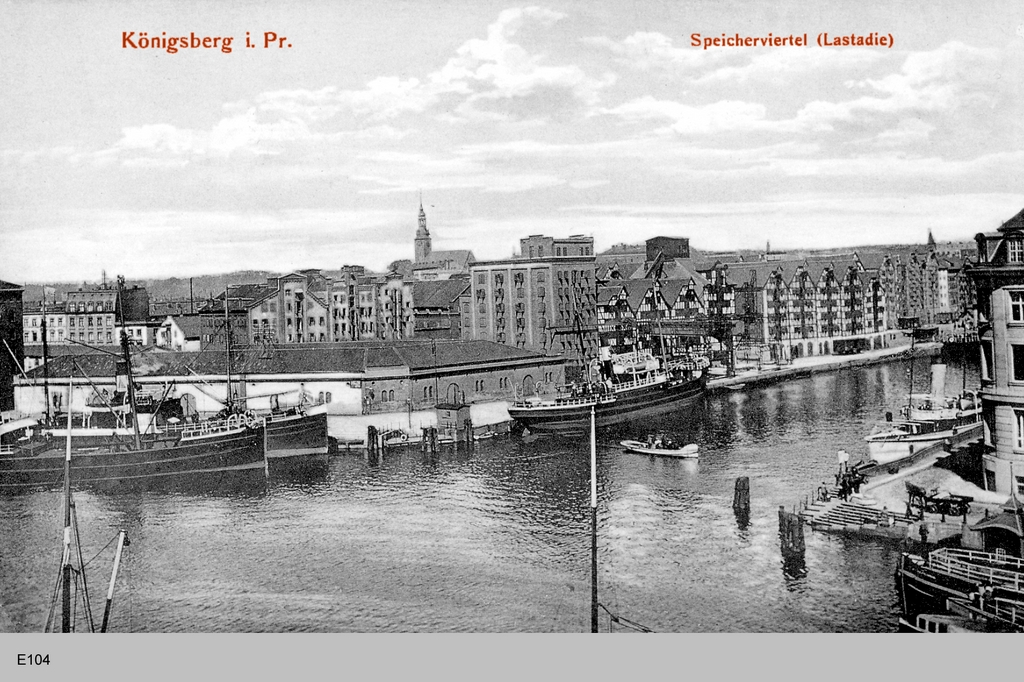
Postcard of Lastadie

Lastadie was a quarter of central Königsberg, Germany. Its territory is now part of Kaliningrad, Russia.

== Etymology ==
The name Lastadie is derived from the Medieval Latin Lastagium, referring specifically to sailing ballast and generally to loading docks. In Old High German it became ladastat and in Middle Low German Lastadie. In the Low Prussian dialect of Königsberg it was pronounced Lastaadje. While medieval docks were also built by Kneiphof (in Vordere Vorstadt) and Löbenicht (in neighboring Anger), the usage of "Lastadie" in Königsberg referred almost exclusively to those of Altstadt built south of Laak.

== History ==
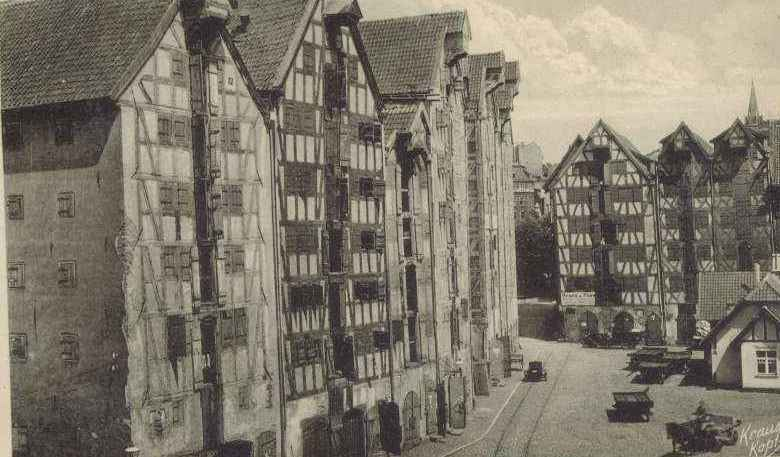
Lastadie warehouses

The oldest docks of Königsberg were located on an island then known as Vogtswerder within the Pregel River. The 1286 charter of Altstadt allowed the town to build these initial docks (later known as the Kai, meaning quay) on the western coast of the island, connected to Altstadt by the Grüne Brücke (Green Bridge). With the establishment of Kneiphof on the island Vogtswerder as a rival town in 1327, however, Altstadt was forced to move its dock operation.

Documented in 1339, the new Lastadie docks were built to the southwest outside of Altstadt's original walls. This new warehouse district was eventually bounded by the roads Neuer Graben and Reifschlägerstraße to the west and north, respectively, and the Pregel to the east and south. In 1804 Ludwig von Baczko described Lastadie as being bounded by Altstadt, Laak, the Pregel, the 17th century city walls, and Holländer Baum.

Medieval Lastadie was burned down by troops from Elbing (Elbląg) and Frauenburg (Frombork) led by Johann Schalski (Jan Szalski) in 1464 during the Thirteen Years' War. Altstadt's slaughterhouse was documented in Lastadie in 1613, but was probably built earlier.

By the Rathäusliche Reglement of 13 June 1724, King Frederick William I of Prussia merged Altstadt and Lastadie into the united city of Königsberg. The great fire of 11 November 1764 caused by a sailmaker in Lastadie was carried to eastern Königsberg by wind and heavily damaged Löbenicht and Sackheim.

Damaged by a fire in 1839, Lastadie's importance declined with the construction of Königsberg's modern docks near Contienen after World War I. Lastadie was destroyed during the 1944 bombing of Königsberg in World War II.

== Buildings ==
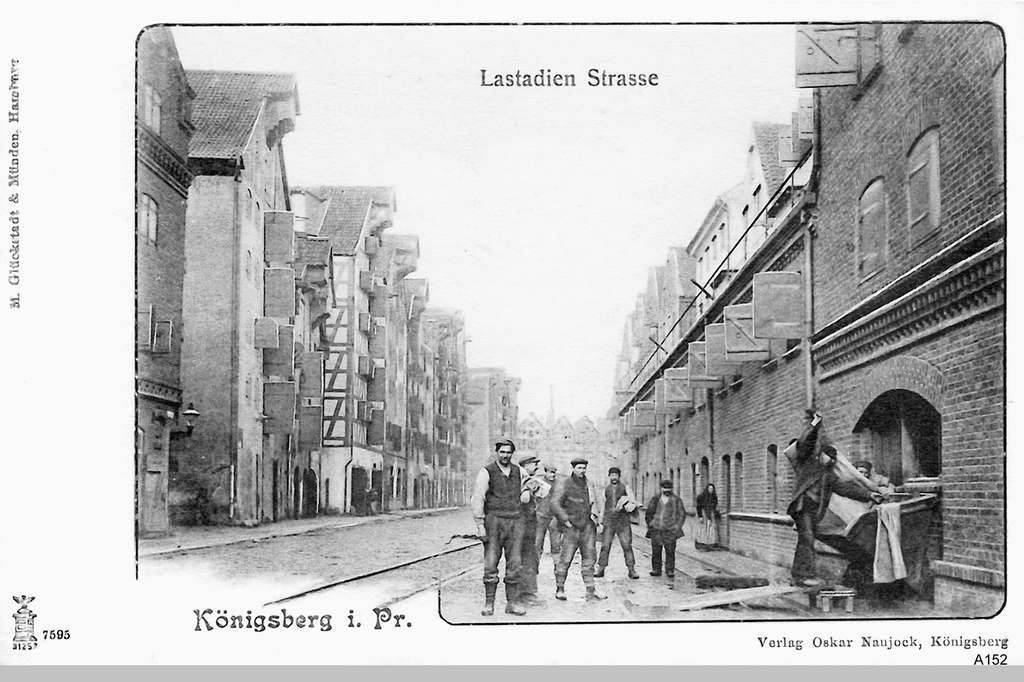
Workers along Lastadienstraße

Lastadie was often referred to as Königsberg's Speicherviertel (warehouse quarter) or Hafenviertel (harbor quarter), because of its numerous multi-storied Fachwerk warehouses built from the 16th-18th centuries. These decorated buildings had expressive names, such as Sonne, Adler, Glaube, Löwe, Bär, Taube, Merkur, and Pelikan. The warehouses Hengst and Bulle dated to 1589.

Altstadt's stock exchange, the Börse, was located in Lastadie along the Hundegatt branch of the Pregel. It ceased its function as a stock exchange in 1724 during the unification of Königsberg and was later dismantled. A Mennonite church was located on Altstädtischer Tränkgasse since 1 January 1770.

Bordering the warehouses was the mercantile district Lizent, where tolls charged on goods arriving from the Pregel were collected at the Lizenthaus. Much of Königsberg's Dutch, English, Swedish, and Danish population settled in Lizent.

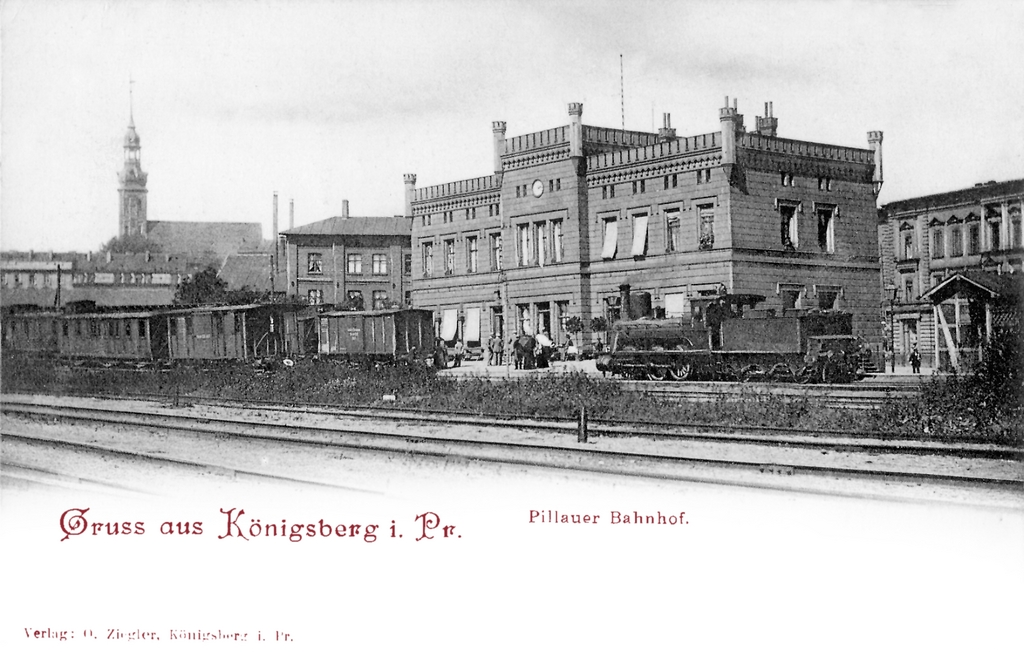
Pillauer Bahnhof with Neurossgarten Church in the background

The Holländer Baum was a barricade of chained tree branches located at the exit of the Pregel from the city, near Krausenecksche Wallstraße and the medieval city walls. Used to enforce tolls on ships arriving from the west, the Holländer Baum was first documented in 1459 and probably rebuilt by 1570. It was named after the large number of ships from medieval Holland which traded in the city. The Litauer Baum by Sackheim in eastern Königsberg was a similar barricade.

West of Lizent and south of Laak were the 15th century Klapperwiese or Klappholzwiese, meadows used for the storage of clapholt or clapboard staves. The meadows, later known as the Lizentwiese, were gradually developed. Located on the thoroughfare Holländerbaumstraße (formerly Holzwiesenstraße) was a Hauptzollamt office (formerly Lizenthaus), which administered ship and rail tolls. To the west was the Heeresverpflegung-Hauptamt, the food supply office of the army. The Lizentbahnhof, also known as the Pillauer Bahnhof, was a train station constructed in 1865 in the former meadow land, located along Lizentgrabenstraße north of the bridge Eisenbahnbrücke (built 1863-65). This was replaced in 1929 by the opening of Bahnhof Holländerbaum north of the bridge Reichsbahnbrücke (built 1913).
