= New Altstadt Church =

Coordinates: 54°42′47″N 20°30′34″E

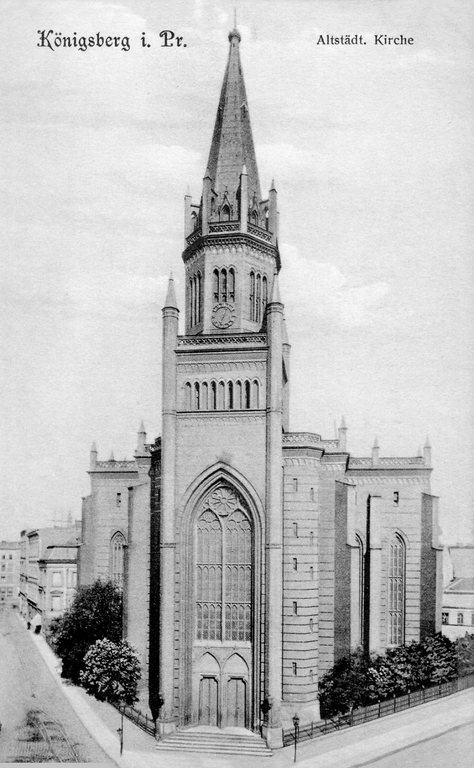
Postcard depicting the church along Junkerstraße

The New Altstadt Church (German: Neue Altstädtische Kirche), also known simply as Altstadt Church, was a Protestant church in the Altstadt quarter of Königsberg, Germany. It was built as a replacement for the dismantled medieval Altstadt Church.

== History ==
The original Altstadt Church, which dated from 1264 and was located south of Königsberg Castle, was dismantled from 1826 to 1828 because of cracks and sinking. Services were temporarily moved to Neurossgarten Church. The replacement church's site was chosen as the intersection of Kreytzenscher Platz and Junkerstraße north of the castle. Construction began in 1838 based on plans by Karl Friedrich Schinkel. Although the original design had to be reduced in scale because of cost, the Brick Neo-Gothic church was praised for its columns. The New Altstadt Church was dedicated in 1845, with its pulpit, choir, and altar transferred from or based on its predecessor.

A highlight of the church was its 13 m tall high altar. It included a wooden carving from 1606 by an unknown master of the crucifixion of Jesus, John the Apostle, Mary of Nazareth, Mary Magdalene, and the thieves Dismas and Gesmas. The carving was moved to a massive barn near Arnau in 1943, but was subsequently lost during World War II. Also notable was a deer chandelier with Mother and Child from c. 1500. Its confessional was designed by Isaak Riga the Younger.

The church's exterior survived the war and was in a good shape, with only the interior destroyed by the 1944 Bombing of Königsberg but it was not rebuilt by the Soviet administration in Kaliningrad after the 1945 Battle of Königsberg following a campaign to delete Königsberg's German element. The remnants of the outer walls were dismantled in 1959 and columns from its portico are included in the entrance of Kaliningrad's Baltika Stadium.

== Gallery ==
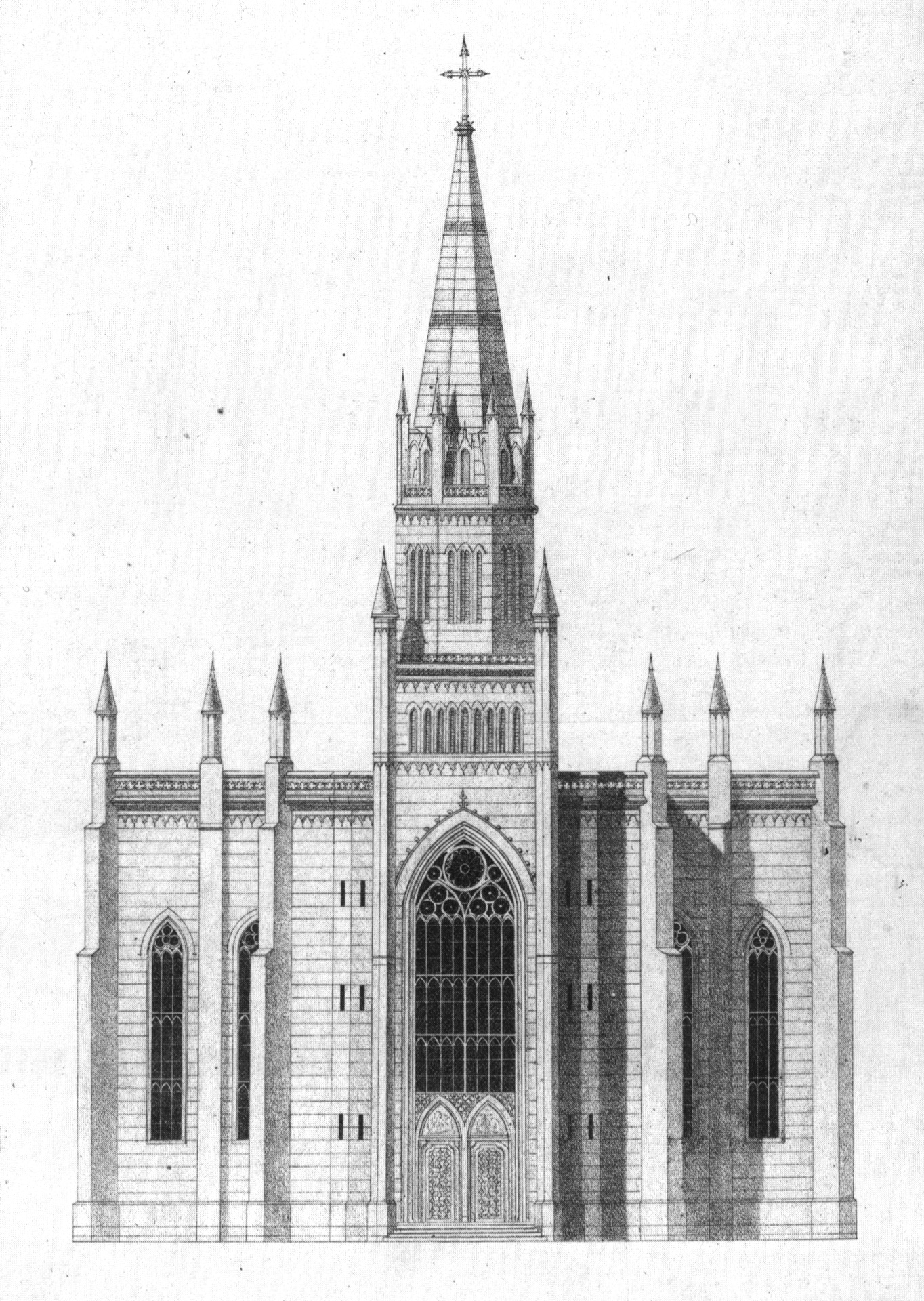
Design by Karl Friedrich Schinkel

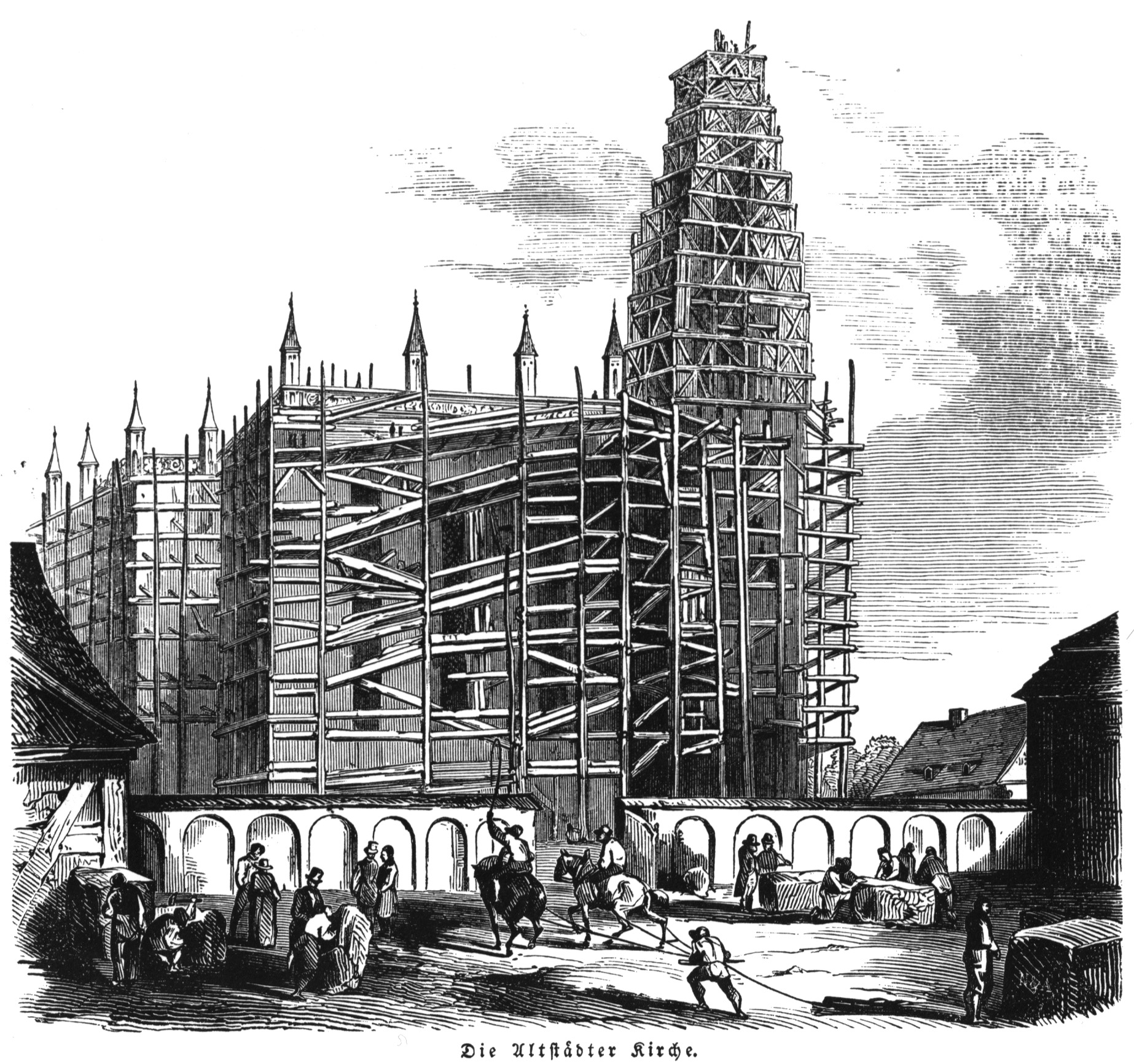
Construction of the New Altstadt Church, 1844

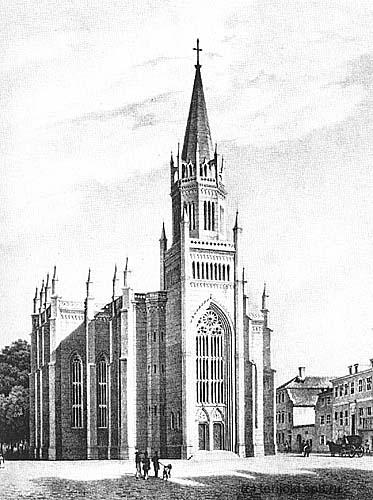
New Altstadt Church, 1845

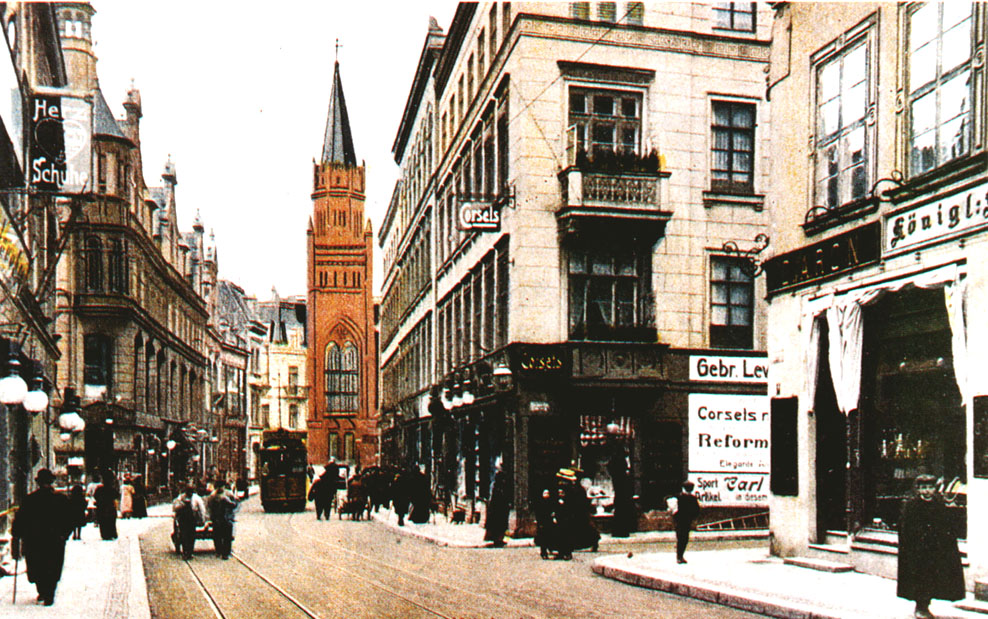
Lithograph depicting the red clinker brick church

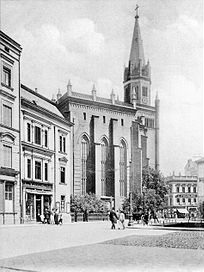
Postcard depicting the church from Junkerstraße
