= Aweiden =

Aweiden or Aweyden was first a suburb of and then a quarter of Königsberg, Germany, located south of the city center. Its territory is now part of the Moskovsky District of Kaliningrad, Russia.

== History ==
Adjacent to Aweiden were Ponarth to the northwest, Speichersdorf to the north, and Schönfliess to the east. The estate of Aweiden was controlled by Königsberg by 1550; Johann Schnürlein, mayor of Kneiphof and ducal chamberlain, owned it in 1579. Aweiden was sold in 1660 after a fire, but was eventually owned by the ducal official Friedrich Kupner (1648-1719).

In the 19th century the estate was recreationally visited by Königsberg's upper classes. Politically active students from the University of Königsberg held a commercium in Aweiden in 1835. A competition featuring 600 gymnasts was held in Aweiden in 1862; it was so well-received that the Collegium Fridericianum made it an annual event.

Aweiden was incorporated into Königsberg in 1939. The road Aweider Allee led from Mühlenhof at the Pregel south through Rosenau, Speichersdorf, and Aweiden to Königsberg's southern city limit.
