= Komsomolskoye Microdistrict =

Part of the city of Kaliningrad, Russia

Komsomolskoye (Russian: Комсомо́льское) is a residential area in Moskovsky District of the city of Kaliningrad, Russia. It was formerly known by its German language names Schönfliess and Schönfließ as first a suburban village and then a quarter of Königsberg, Germany, located southeast of the city center.

Schönfliess was located southeast of Speichersdorf, southwest of Jerusalem, and west of Seligenfeld. Medieval Schönfliess contained a hospital, which was purchased by Kneiphof in 1521. Albert, Duke of Prussia, then granted the farming village to Kneiphof on 10 May 1528. The village's farmers worked the estate of Rosenau.

Schönfliess was incorporated into the city of Königsberg in 1939. Königsberg was transferred to Soviet control in 1945 after World War II. Königsberg was subsequently renamed Kaliningrad and Schönfliess first became Komsomolsky gorodok (Комсомольский городок) and then, in 1949, Komsomolskoye.
