= Georg Puppe =

German physician and examiner (1867–1925)

Georg Puppe (4 February 1867 – 20 November 1925) was a German social physician and medical examiner.

== Life ==
Georg Puppe was born on 4 February 1867. He attended the Raths- and Friedrichs-Gymnasium in Kostrzyn nad Odrą, where he graduated in 1884. He then studied medicine in Berlin and Göttingen. In 1887, he became a member of the fraternity Burschenschaft Brunsviga. In 1888, Puppe completed his exams in Berlin and received his doctorate in the same year with the subject: "Investigations on the sequelae after Abortus".

From 1888 to 1891, he worked in the judge's asylum in Berlin-Pankow and then in the internal medicine department of the Urban Hospital in Berlin under Albert Fraenkel. In 1894, he was an assistant physician in surgery with Werner Körte. From 1895 to 1896 he was assistant to Eduard Ritter von Hofmann at the Institute of Forensic Medicine at the University of Vienna, where he habilitated on 30 July 1898.

On 24 February 1903, Georg Puppe was appointed as Extraordinarius and Director of the newly created Institute of Forensic Medicine at the University of Königsberg in the succession of Karl Seydel. In 1921, he took over as successor to Adolf Lesser as the director of the Institute of Forensic Medicine at the Silesian Frederick William University in Breslau (today Wrocław), which he held until his death. Shortly before, his teaching assignment had been extended to his work on the field of social medicine, which he had helped considerably. In 1925 Puppe died at the age of 57 of a pulmonary embolism.

== Work ==
He pushed the emergence of preventive social medicine from the beginning of the 20s from Breslau. In addition to his involvement in legislative procedures, such as the raising of the penalty limit of the Juvenile Court Act, newly adopted on 16 February 1923, to 14 years and the publication of numerous contributions and textbooks, he was also co-editor of the "Journal of Forensic Medicine." Together with Carl Ipsen and Julius Kratter from Austria as well as Adolf Lesser, Fritz Strassmann, and Emil Ungar, Puppe founded the German Society of Forensic Medicine on 20 September 1904 in Meran, the precursor organization of today's German Society of Legal Medicine. In 1910 he was appointed president.

His most well-known discovery is the Puppe's rule, which allows the sequence of impacts of a blunt object on the human skull to be determined by means of an analysis of the fracture edges.

Among his pupils are Martin Nippe, Victor Müller-Hess, Herwart Fischer, and Friedrich Pietrusky.

== Puppe's rule ==
Puppe was the first to point out that it is possible to determine the sequence of injuries in skull fractures caused by blows to the head because the second fracture ends at the point where a break in cohesion is already present.

Even though this rule is true for all blunt injuries to the skull, it is of particular importance in gunshot wounds. The fracture lines created by every other shot extend only up to the fractured lines produced by the previous shot without continuing over them.

Puppe proposed the rule in the paper Traumatische Todesursachen in Gerichtliche Medizin in 1903. His name is often omitted when it is discussed in English language literature.
