= Kosse (Königsberg) =

Coordinates: 54°42′27″N 20°28′46″E

Kosse or Cosse was a quarter of western Königsberg, Germany. Its territory is now part of the Tsentralny District of Kaliningrad, Russia.

Kosse was originally a fishing village under the control of Altstadt on the northern shore of the lower Pregel. It was bordered to the northwest by Ratshof, to the north by Mittelhufen, and to the east by Laak, Lizent, and the 17th century Königsberg fortifications. Peter the Great of Russia stayed overnight at the inn of Kosse in 1712. By 1804 it contained a modest Gasthaus visited by the city's upper class.

Kosse began to develop into an industrial district at the beginning of the 20th century, and in 1905 was incorporated into the city of Königsberg. The city's gasworks was moved from Hintere Vorstadt to Kosse in 1902, while the new power station opened in Kosse in 1907; both facilities were constructed through the initiative of city construction councillor Ferdinand Krieger. Norddeutsche Zellulose A.G., a cellulose factory, was constructed from 1906 to 1907. A large street car depot also opened in Kosse in 1907, while a cold storage warehouse was completed in 1914. Just east of Kosse was the train station Bahnhof Holländerbaum, opened in 1929.
