= Neurossgarten Church =

Church in Königsberg, Germany

Neurossgarten church
- Neuroßgärter kirche
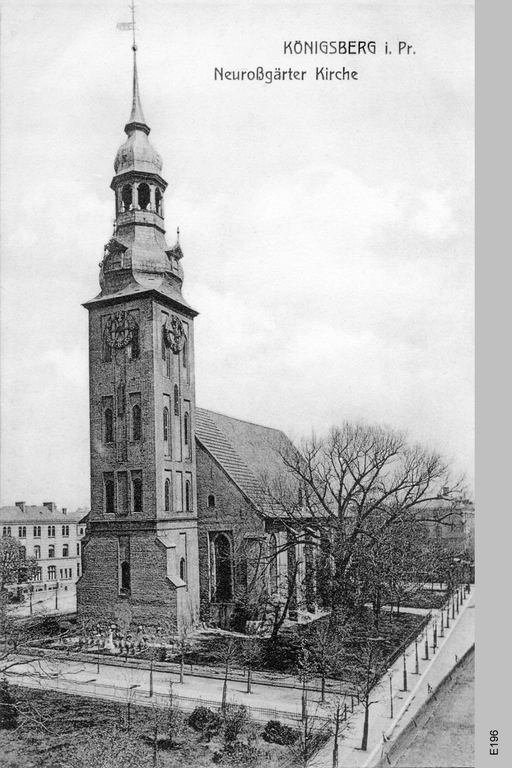
- Neurossgarten church
- 54°42′43.4″N 20°30′02″E
- Denomination: Protestant

History
- Status: Not preserved
- Founded: 1643
- Consecrated: 5. December 1647

Architecture
- Groundbreaking: 31. May 1643
- Demolished: 1975

Neurossgarten Church (German: Neuroßgärter or Neuroßgärtner Kirche) was a Protestant church in northwestern Königsberg, Germany.

== History ==
The church was approved in 1643 because of the growing size of Altstadt Church. Construction began on 31 May 1644 in the Altstadt suburb of Neurossgarten, with its dedication by the Altstadt pastor Martin Wolder following on 5 December 1647.

The choir-less hall had a wood barrel ceiling decorated with lunettes. Its 90 m copper-covered steeple, completed in 1695 at a cost of 30,000 guilders, was used as a landmark by ships. Its turret clock was added in 1697. The organ was built by Georg Sigismund Caspari from 1734 to 1737. A lightning rod was added after a lightning strike in 1817. Because of its steeple, the church was for a long time the tallest building in the city.

The church contained a splendid 17th-century painted ceiling expressing biblical images and a pulpit from 1648 by an unknown master. The pulpit was decorated with expressive figures and a Salvator Mundi. The crucifix on the chalice-side gallery was designed by Isaak Riga the Younger and his father.

The baptismal chamber depicted Jesus Christ as a friend to children, as well as seven virtues. Connected with the chamber was the confessional from 1662 and a hand towel-holding angel from 1666. Michael Doebel the Elder was the sculptor.

Ludwig Ernst von Borowski, who later became a Protestant archbishop, served as the church's pastor beginning in 1782. A painting by Andreas Knorre hung inside the church, while Stanislaus Cauer added a bust of Borowski for the northern exterior in 1907.

Neurossgarten Church was heavily damaged by the 1944 Bombing of Königsberg and 1945 Battle of Königsberg. The Soviet administration in Kaliningrad demolished its remnants in 1975.

== Gallery ==
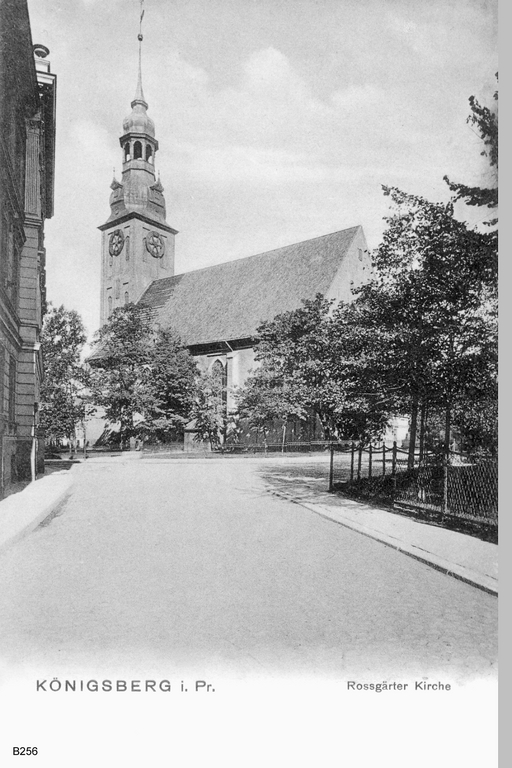
Neurossgarten Church

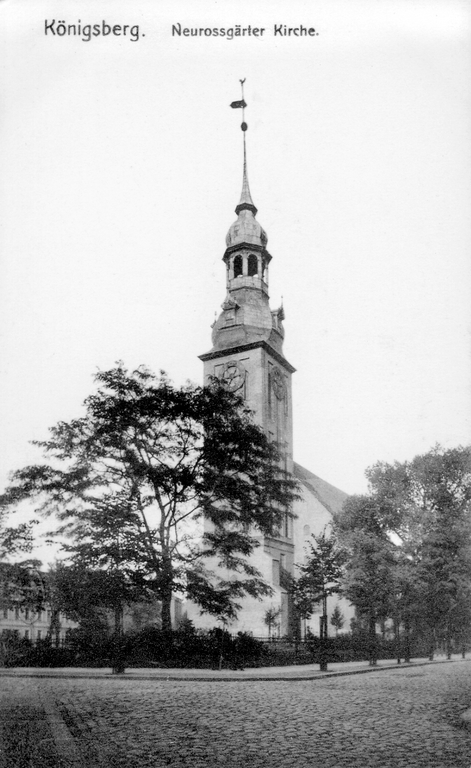
Neurossgarten Church

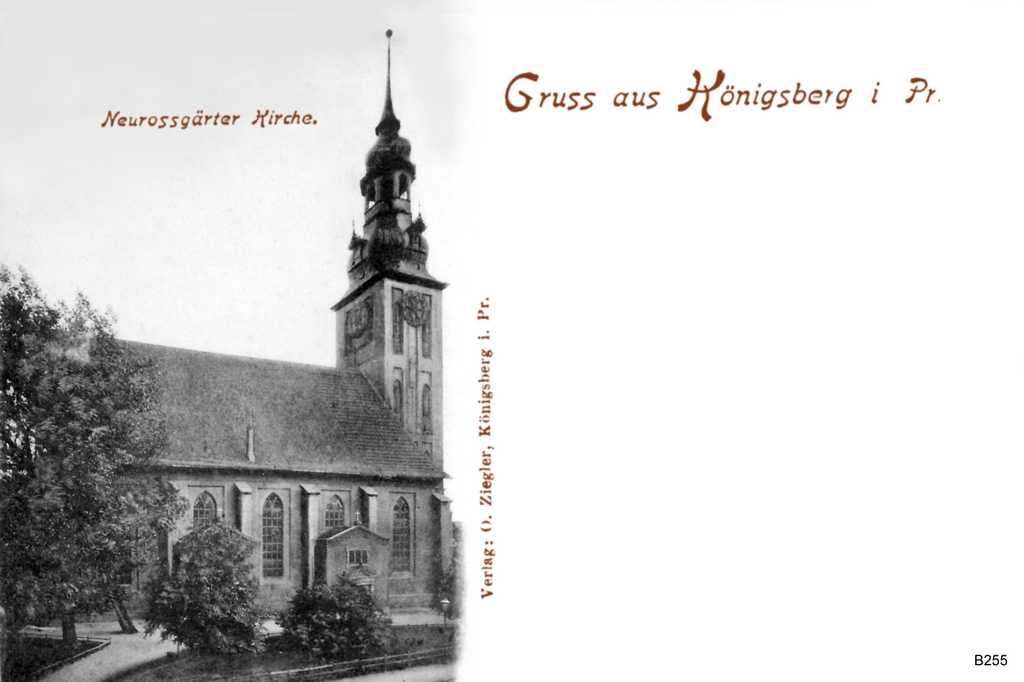
Neurossgarten Church

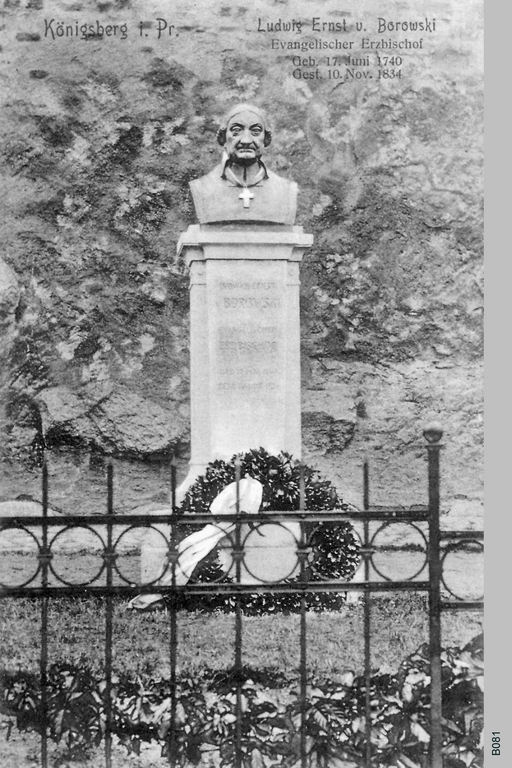
Bust of Ludwig Ernst von Borowski, who became the church's pastor in 1782

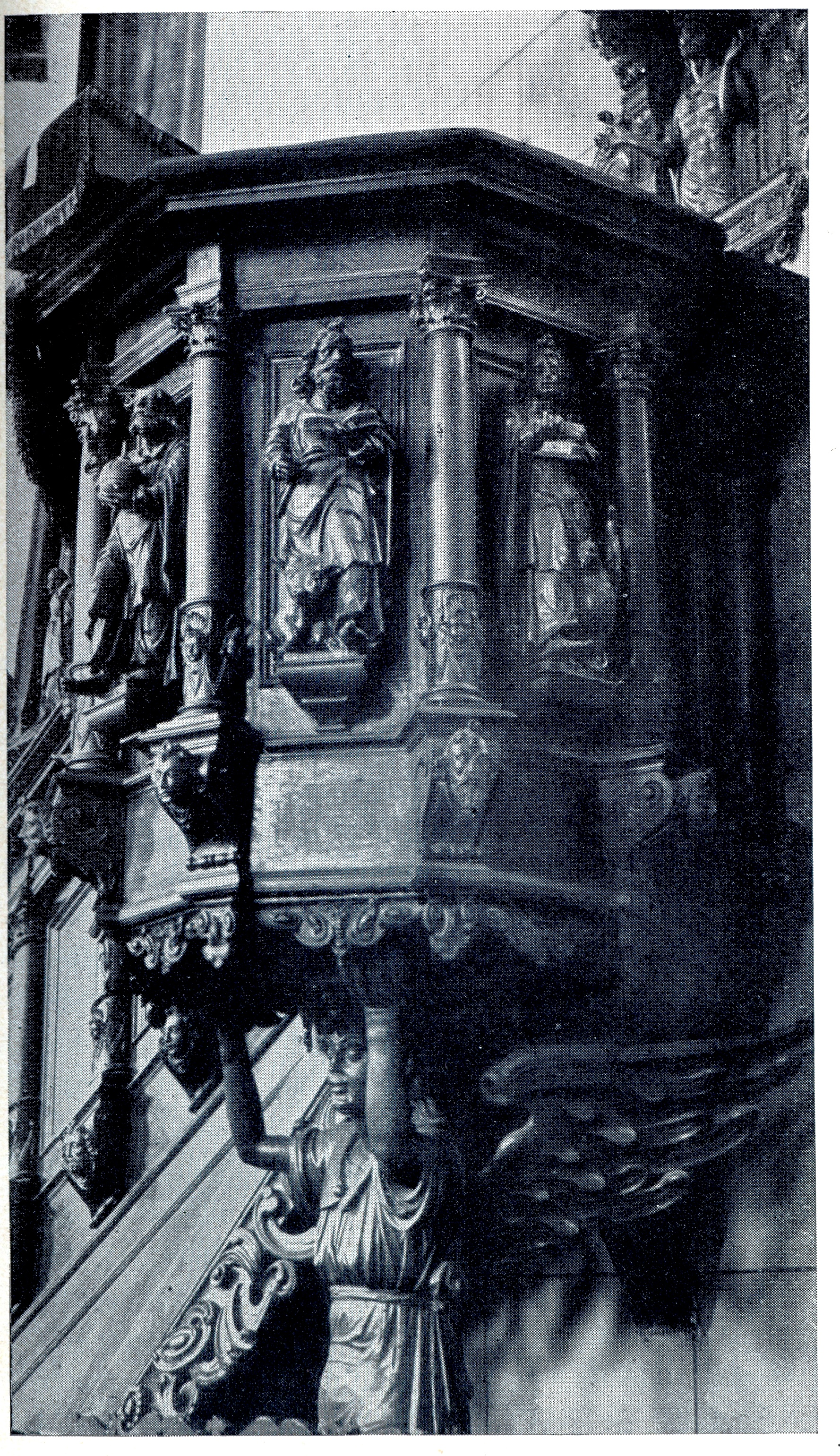
Pulpit in Neurossgarten Church.

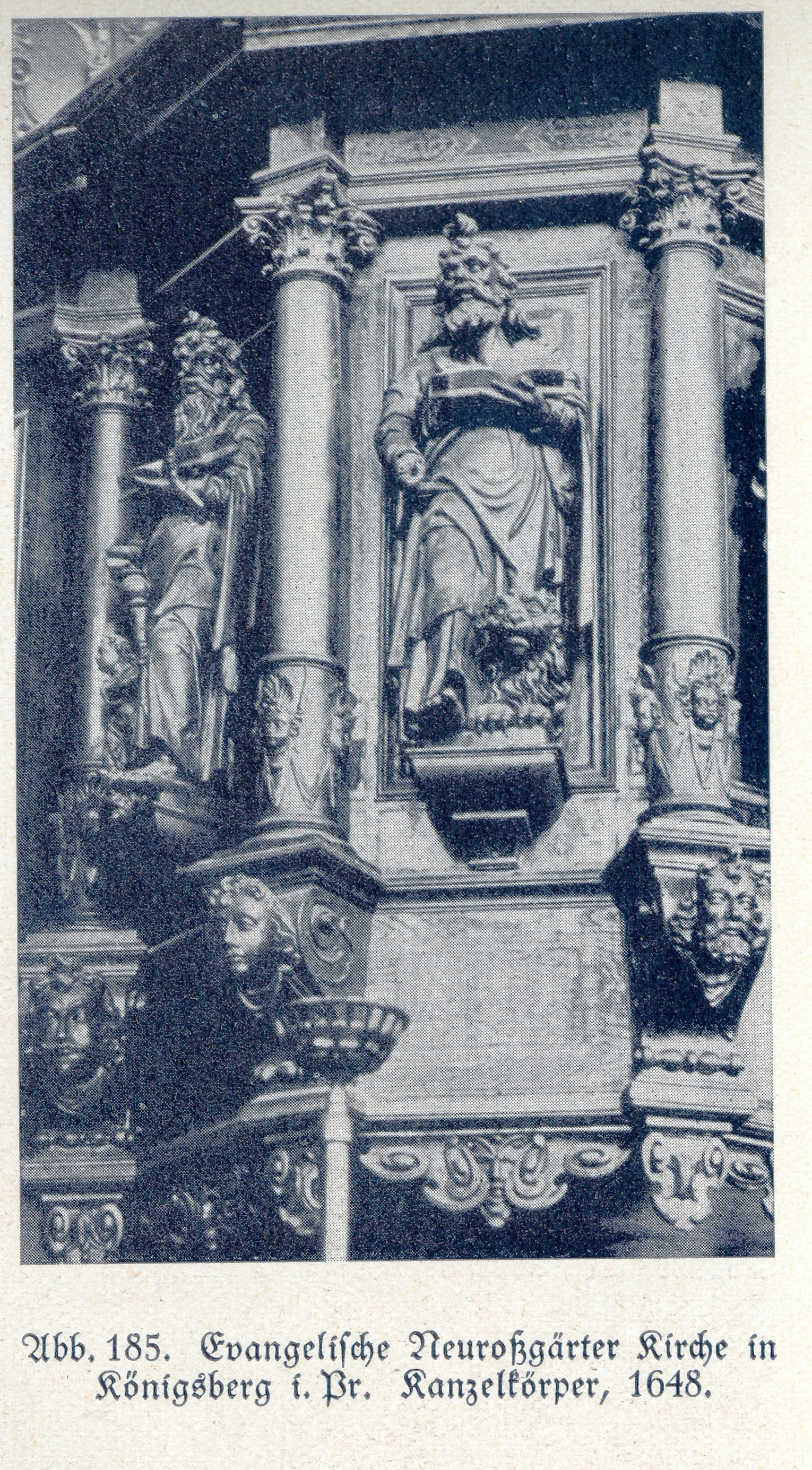
Pulpit decorations in Neurossgarten Church.

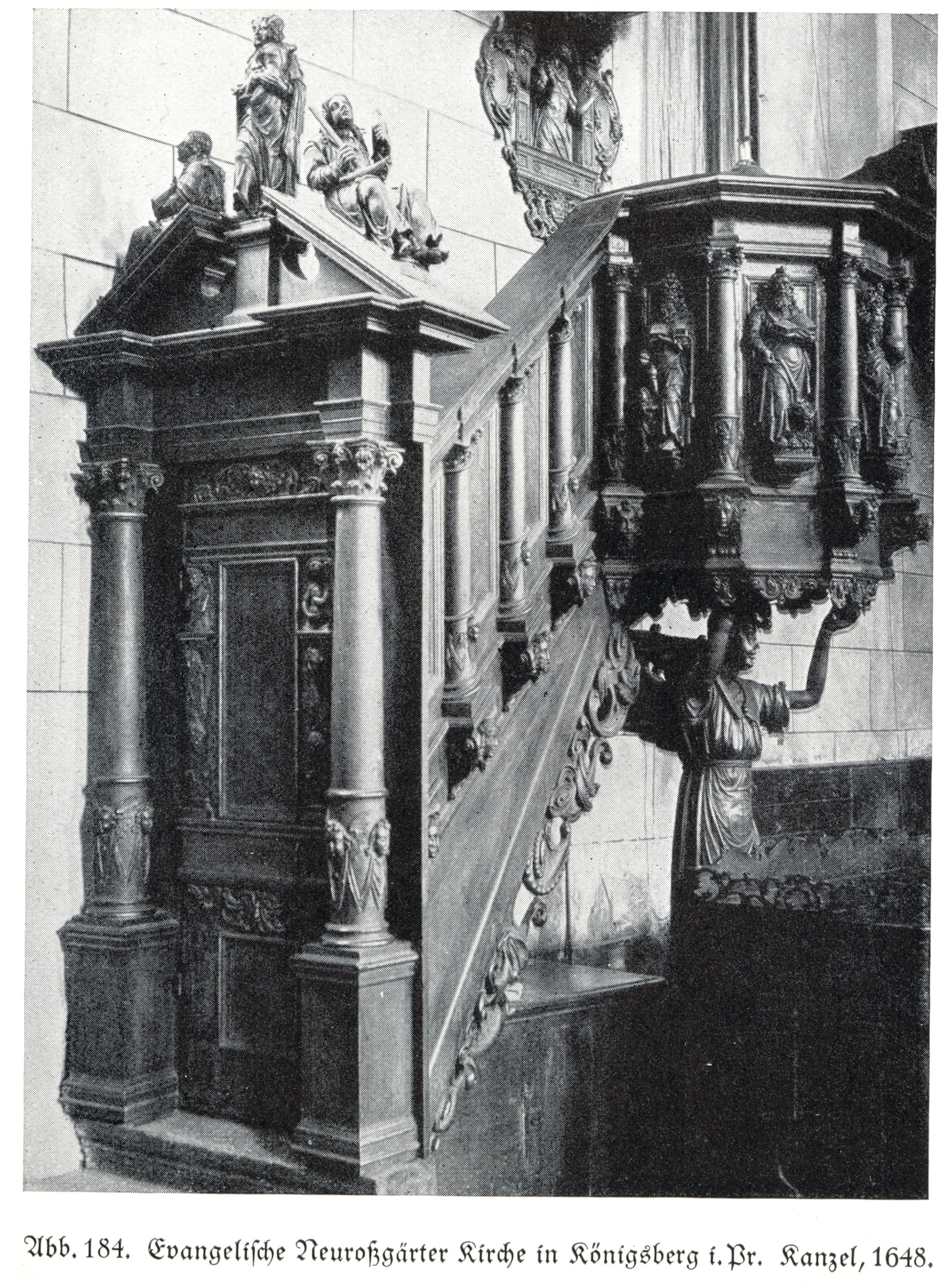
Pulpit in Neurossgarten Church.

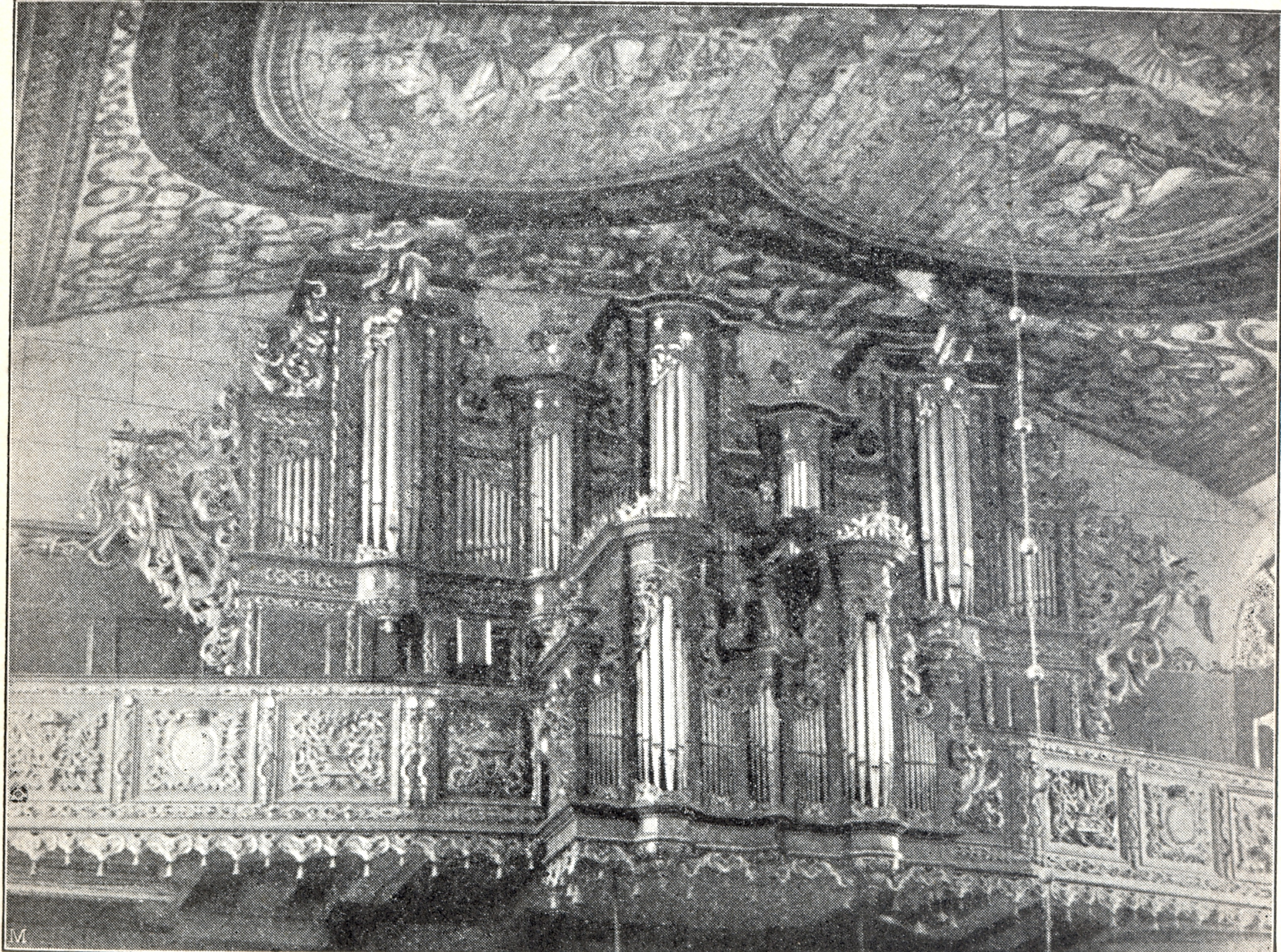
Pipe organ in Neurossgarten Church.

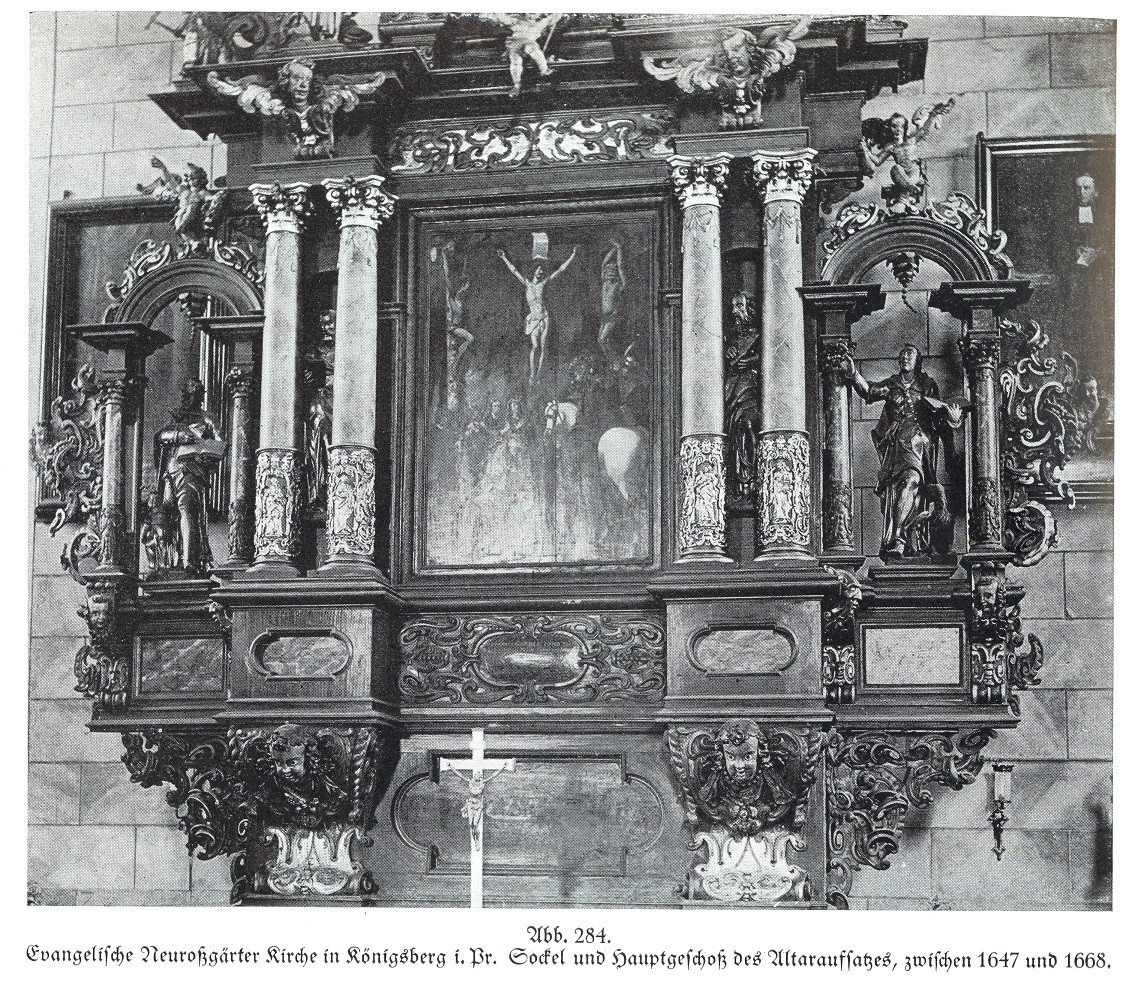
Altarpiece made between 1647 and 1668, in Neurossgarten Church.

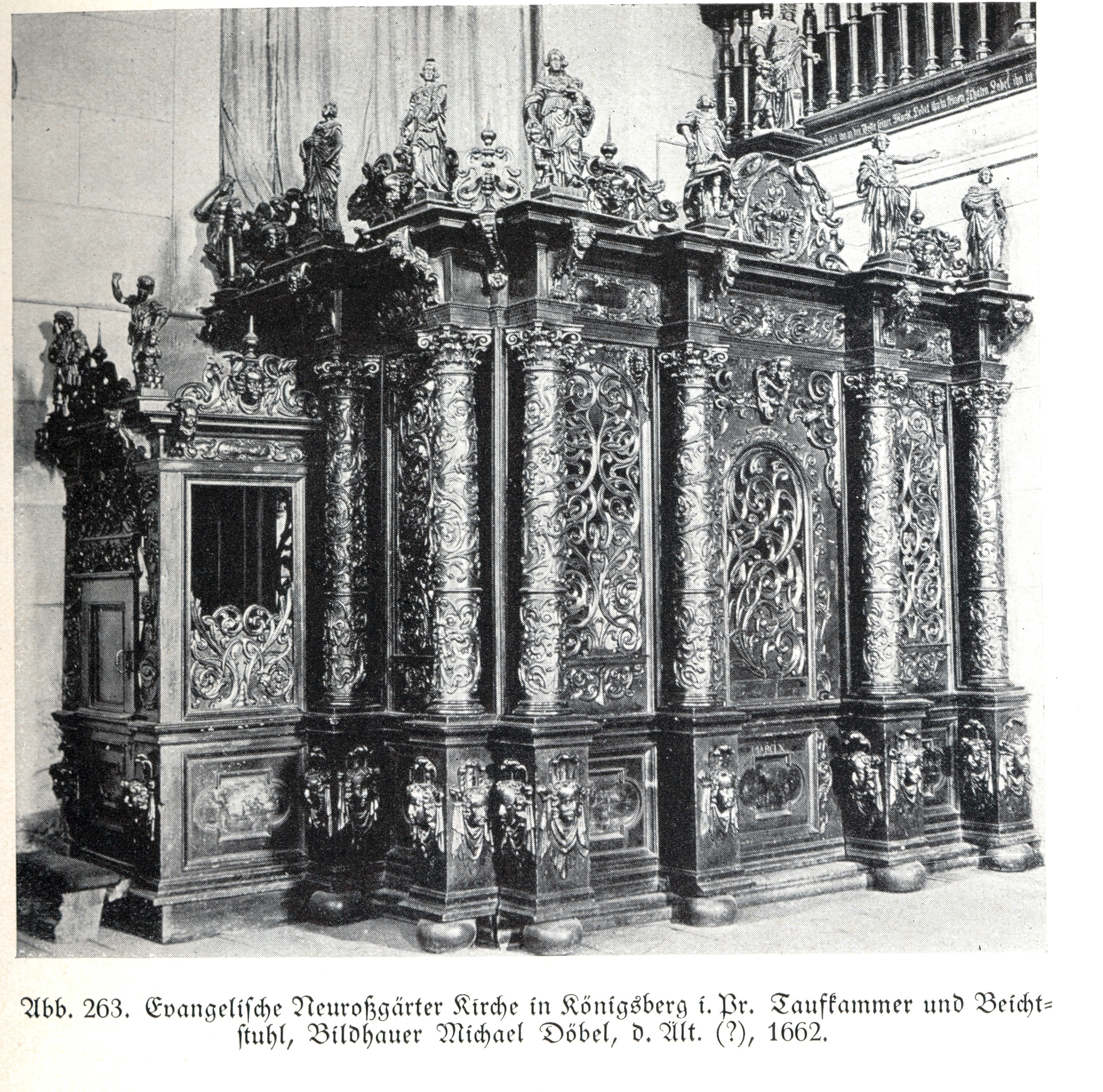
Baptistery and confessional by Michael Döbel the Elder, from 1662.

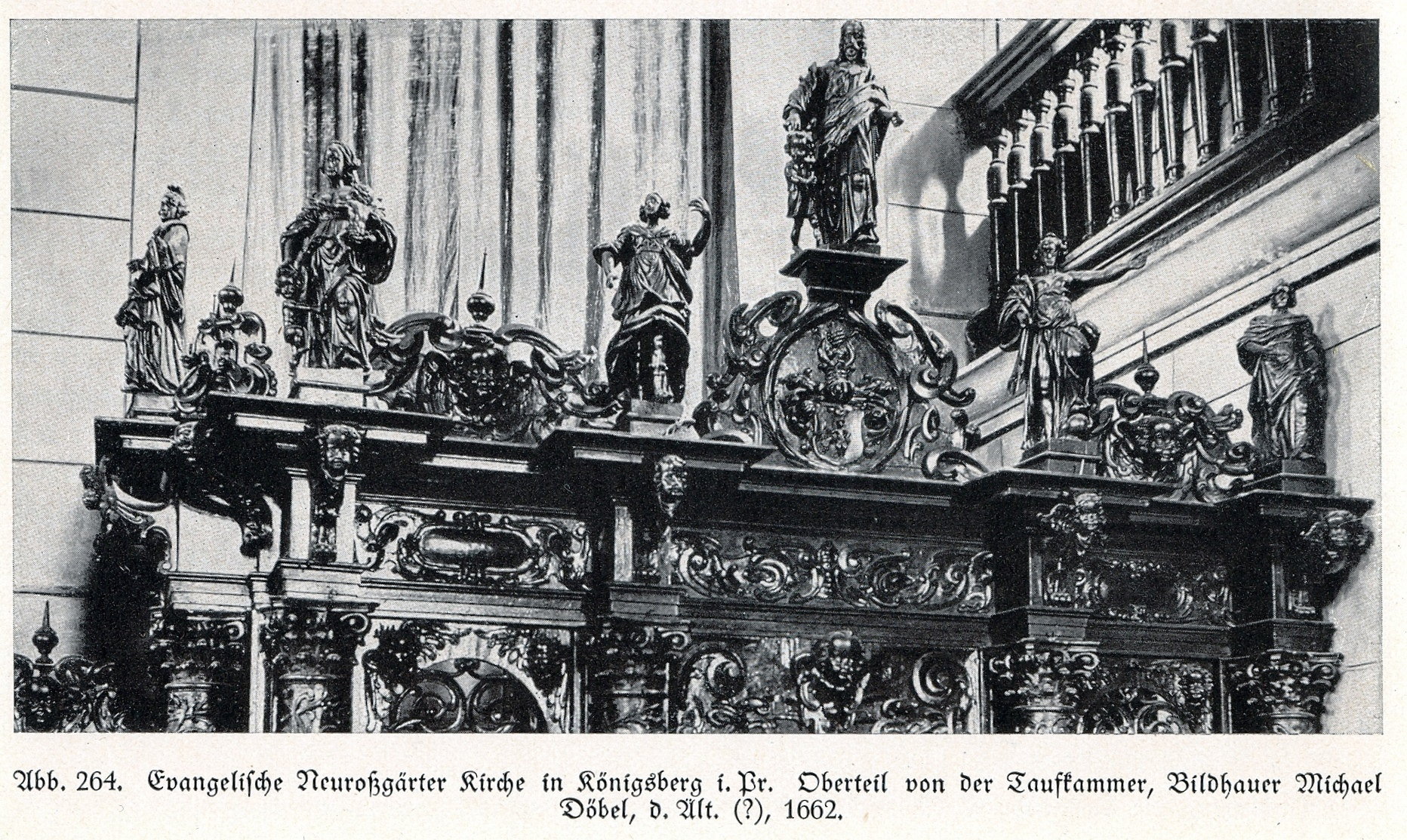
Upper part of the baptistery.
