= Rosenau Church =

Church in Kaliningrad, Russia

Coordinates: 54°41′00″N 20°31′55″E

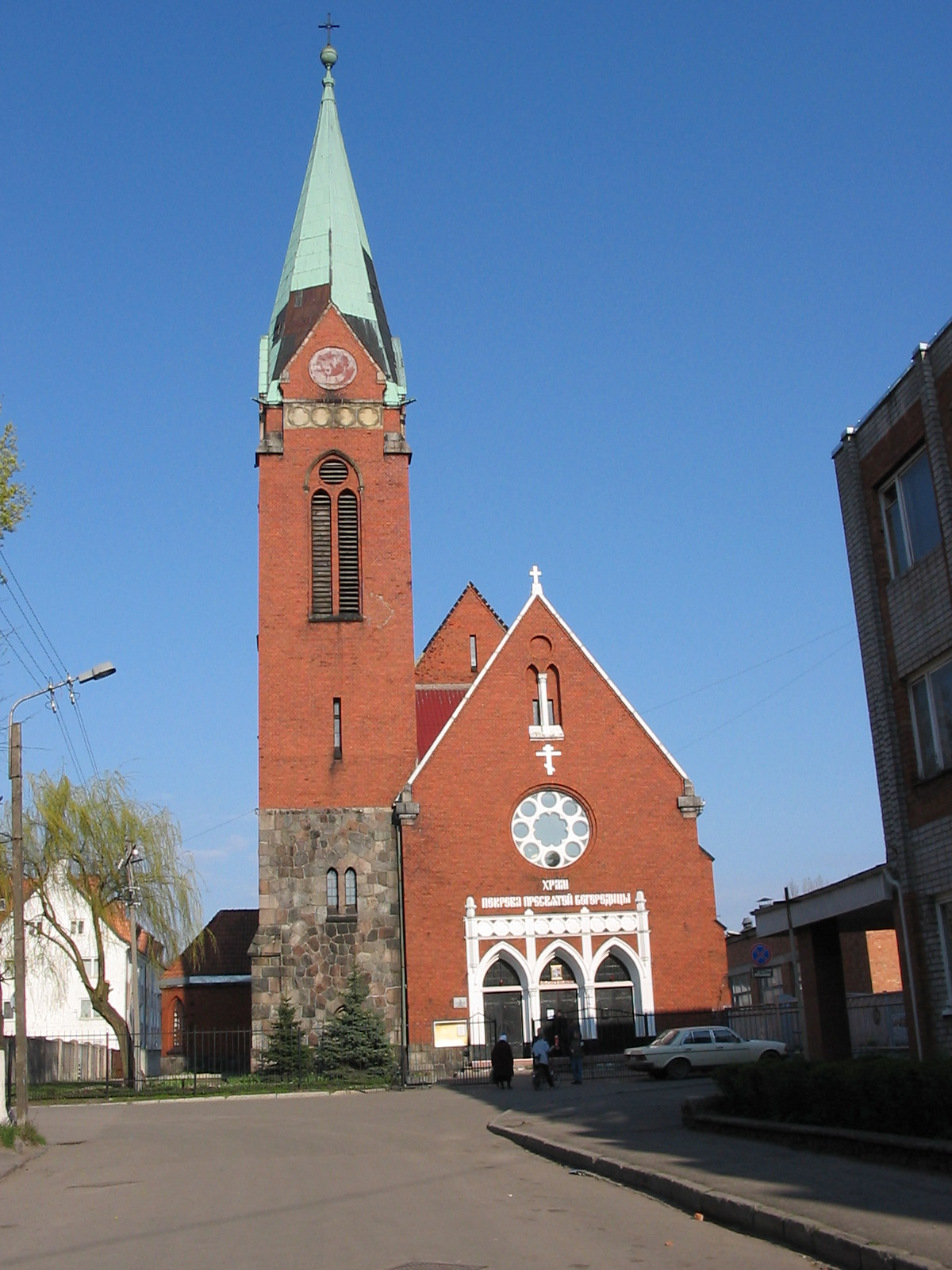
Rosenau Church

Rosenau Church (German: Rosenauer Kirche; Russian: Кирха Розенау) is a church in Kaliningrad, Russia.

The Protestant church was built in Rosenau, a quarter of southern Königsberg, Germany. Land for the new church was donated by the final owners of the estate Rosenau, the Schulte-Heuthaus family. Construction began on 23 July 1914, but was halted due to the outbreak of World War I. It was finally completed from 2 April 1925 to 12 December 1926. The Neo-Gothic church included material from dismantled sections of the Königsberg fortifications.

Lightly damaged during World War II, the building was then used for storage by the Soviet Union. Renovated from 1990 to 1992, it is now used as a place of worship by the Russian Orthodox Church.
