= Speichersdorf (Königsberg) =

Speichersdorf was first a suburb of and then a quarter of Königsberg, Germany, located south of the city center. Its territory is now part of the Moskovsky District of Kaliningrad, Russia.

== History ==
Speichersdorf was neighbored by Rosenau to the north, Ponarth to the west, Aweiden to the south, and Schönfliess to the southeast. In the late 17th century the estate was controlled by the ducal official Friedrich Kupner (1648–1719). On 16 June 1927 the estate and village were incorporated into the city of Königsberg. In the first half of the 20th century it developed into a working class quarter. Speichersdorf also contained a psychiatric hospital which was converted into a retirement home in the 1920s.
