= Neuendorf Church =

Church building in Kaliningrad, Russia

Coordinates: 53.7370°N 9.5700°E

Neuendorf Church (German: Neuendorfkirche) was a Protestant church in the Rzhevskoye Microdistrict of Königsberg, Germany.

The originally Roman Catholic church was built in the second half of the 14th century by the Teutonic Order. Although Königsberg was located within the Bishopric of Samland, its suburbs south of the Pregel, such as Neuendorf, were disputed by the Bishopric of Ermland. The church converted to Lutheranism in 1525 with the creation of the Duchy of Prussia, but became a daughter church to that of Steinbeck. Damaged by a storm in 1818, it was restored by 1919. The church was built mostly of stone and brick, although the interior was wooden. It contained a large bell from 1501 and a 17th-century oil painting of the crucifixion.

Neuendorf Church was only lightly damaged during World War II, but its roof collapsed in the 1950s. The Soviet administration in Kaliningrad, Russia, eventually demolished its ruins.

== Notes ==
- Bötticher, Adolf (1891). Die Bau- und Kunstdenkmäler der Provinz Ostpreußen. Heft I. Das Samland (in German). Königsberg: Rautenberg. p. 141.
- Gause, Fritz (1965). Die Geschichte der Stadt Königsberg. Band I: Von der Gründung der Stadt bis zum letzten Kurfürsten (in German). Köln: Böhlau Verlag. p. 571.
