= Mühlenhof =

Mühlenhof was first a suburb of and then a quarter of Königsberg, Germany, located southeast of the city center. Its territory is now part of the Moskovsky District of Kaliningrad, Russia.

Mühlenhof developed from a medieval estate run by the mill-master of the Teutonic Knights. In the late 18th century its large manufactory complex consisted of nine windmills and 45 Dutch-style houses for workers. Mühlenhof was incorporated into the city of Königsberg in 1908.

North of Mühlenhof was the Pregel River and Lomse Island, while Haberberg was to the northwest. The stadium Sportplatz am Friedländer Tor was located to the southwest, followed by Rosenau to the south. Farther east along the Pregel was the estate Jerusalem.
