= Altstadt Church =

Coordinates: 54°42′35″N 20°30′35″E

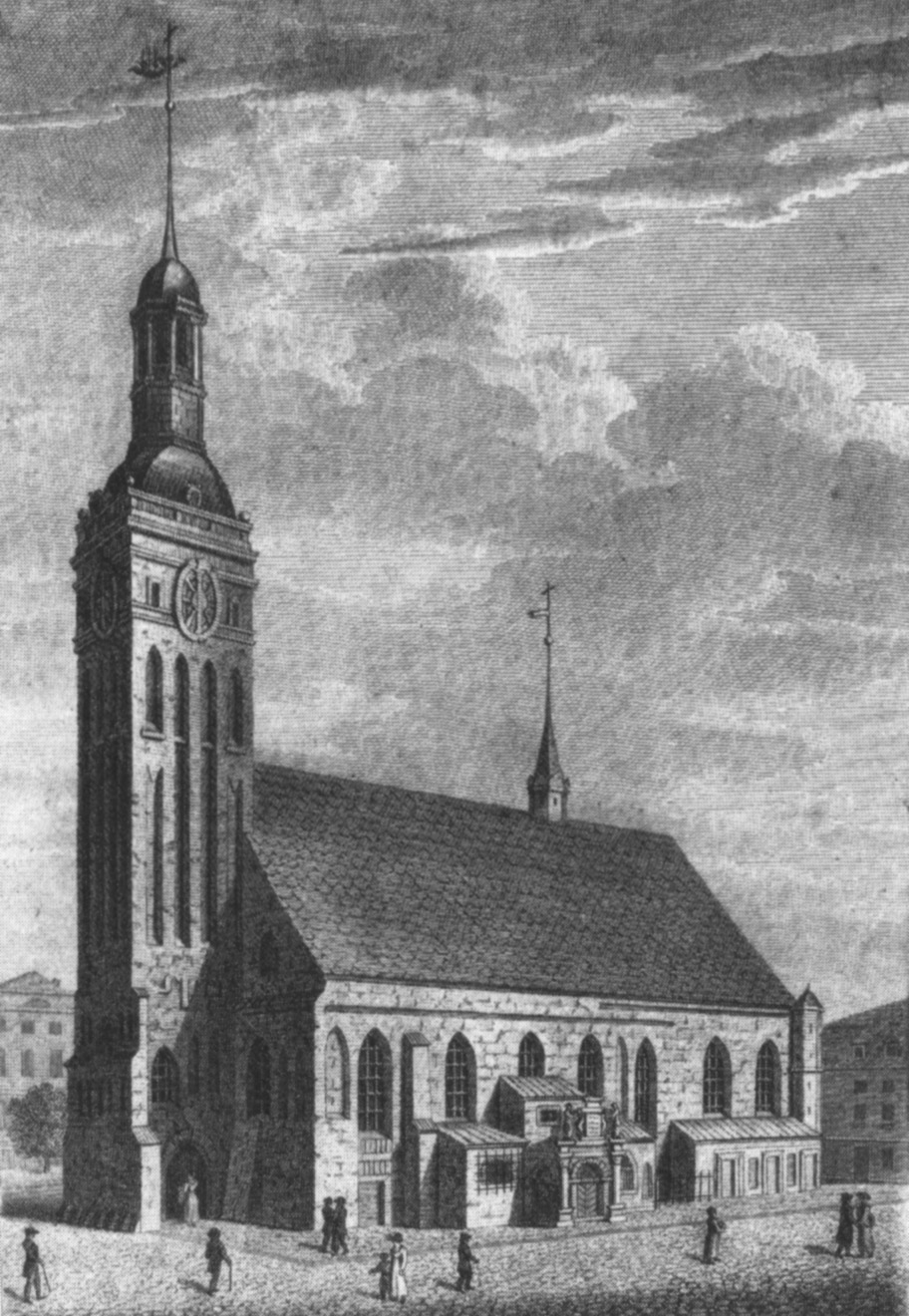
- Altstadtkirche c. 1829
- Altstadt Church
- Location: Altstadt, Königsberg

Architecture
- Years built: 1264, rebuilt in 1504 and 1537
- Demolished: 1820s

Altstadt Church (German: Altstädtische Kirche) was a medieval church in the Altstadt quarter of Königsberg (modern Kaliningrad, Russia). It was dismantled during the 1820s and replaced with New Altstadt Church.

== History ==
The originally Roman Catholic parish church of Saint Nicholas was built in Altstadt south of Königsberg Castle in 1264 and then rebuilt from 1504 to 1537. The Antonine monk Johann Amandus began preaching a Protestant sermon at the church in 1523, but was expelled the following year for being an agitating iconoclast. Johannes Poliander became pastor in 1526 following the creation of the Duchy of Prussia and the parish's conversion to Lutheranism. Johann Funck served as pastor before becoming court preacher in 1549. Andreas Osiander was interred at the church in 1552, as was Hans Luther, Saxon privy councilor and son of Martin Luther, in 1575. Paul Siefert was organist at the church in 1611. Because of the growing size of Altstadt's parish, Neurossgarten Church was constructed in the 1640s to the northwest. Georg Riedel was a cantor at the church from 1709 to 1738. Polish church services were held in the church from 1618 to 1817.

A new organ was designed for the Altstadt Church by Adam Gottlob Casparini in 1763. The church's nearby square, Altstädtischer Kirchenplatz, was developed in 1803.

Because the church had begun to sink and crack, it was dismantled from 1826 to 1828. The last sermon was held there in 1824, with services temporarily moved to Neurossgarten Church. The replacement New Altstadt Church built northwest of the castle was dedicated in 1845. Its pulpit, choir, and altar were transferred from or based on its predecessor.

After the dismantling of the original church, the parish converted the Altstädtischer Kirchenplatz into an enclosed garden; the developing square was renamed Kaiser-Wilhelm-Platz in 1897.

== Gallery ==
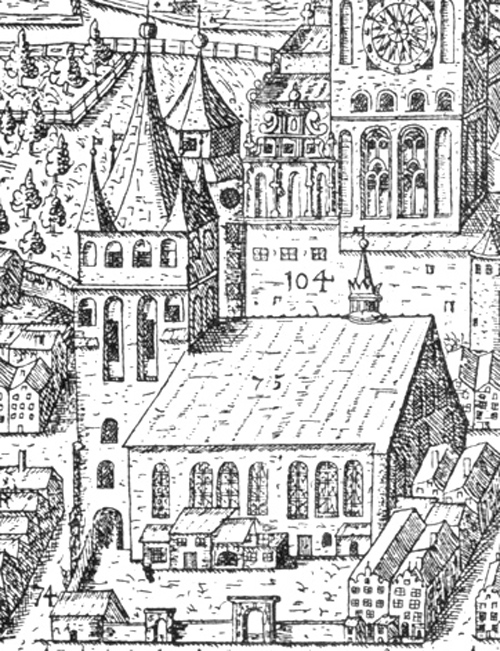
Altstadt Church during the Protestant Reformation, 1613

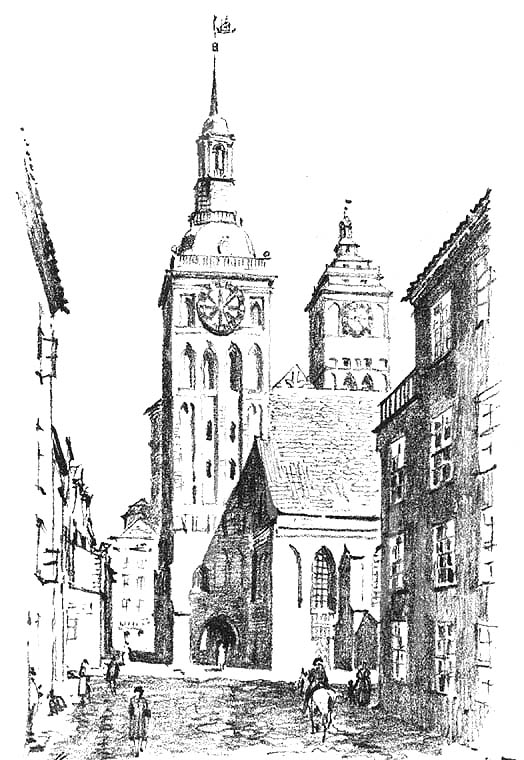
Altstadt Church, in background the original tower of Königsberg Castle's Schlosskirche

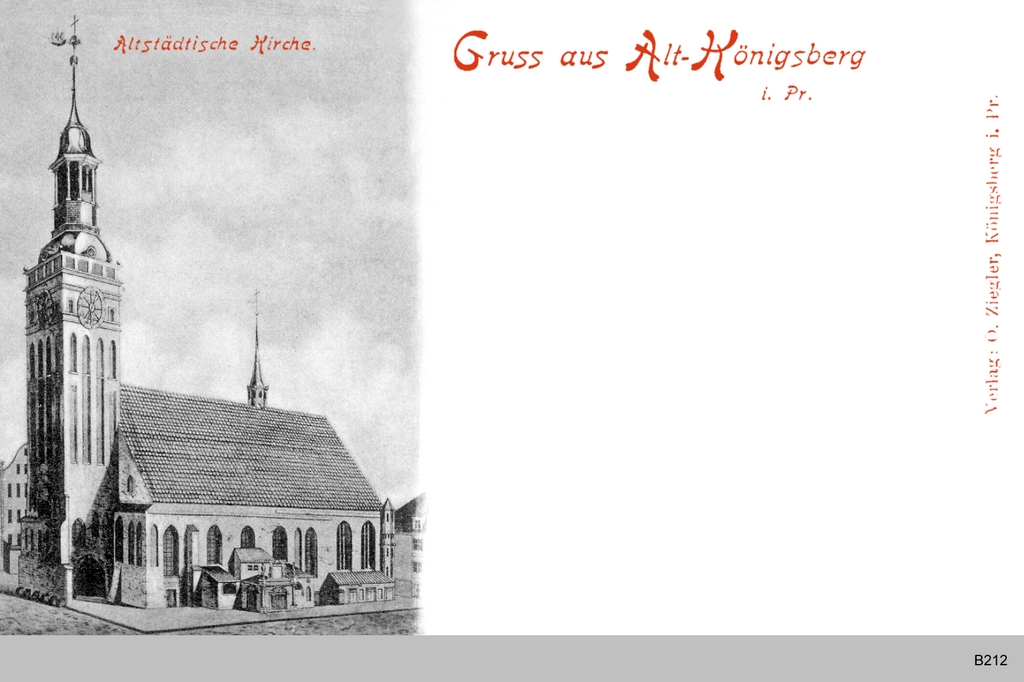
1908 postcard depicting the original Altstadt Church, ca. 1826
