= Neurossgarten =

Quarter of northwestern Königsberg, Germany

Coordinates: 54.7131°N 20.4944°E

Neurossgarten (German: Neuroßgarten) was a quarter of northwestern Königsberg, Germany. Its territory is now part of Kaliningrad, Russia.

== History ==
The name Neuroßgarten means "new horse pasture" in German, with the eastern Königsberg suburb of Rossgarten (or Altroßgarten) being its namesake. The area of Neurossgarten was first mentioned as the Altstädtischer Roßgarten in 1466 in archives of the Teutonic Knights, and consisted of meadows, pastures, gardens, and a cemetery used by Steindamm. Neurossgarten was established as a new suburb of Altstadt separate from Steindamm in 1635.

By the Rathäusliche Reglement of 13 June 1724, King Frederick William I of Prussia merged Altstadt and Neurossgarten into the united city of Königsberg. By 1890 the area from Neurossgarten's Wagnerstraße through Steindamm to Tragheimer Pulverstraße was the most densely settled part of the city. The quarter was heavily damaged by the 1944 Bombing of Königsberg and 1945 Battle of Königsberg.

== Locations ==
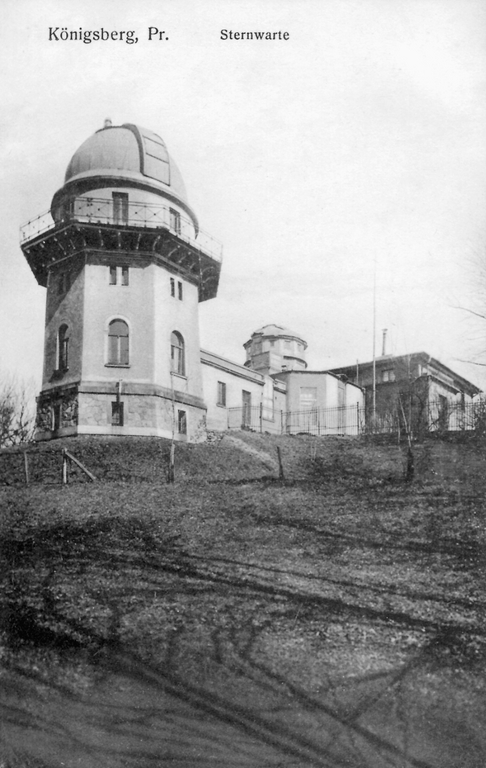
Königsberg Observatory

Neurossgarten was bounded by Steindamm to the east and Laak to the south. To the west and north were the streets Deutschordensring (formerly Krausenecksche Wallstraße) and Kniprodestraße (formerly Alte Gasse), followed by the early 17th century Baroque city walls. Beyond the walls was Mittelhufen.

Neurossgarten Church was a 17th-century Protestant church located in central Neurossgarten. Nearby marketplaces included the Strohmarkt and the Heumarkt.

Also located in the quarter were the Botanischer Garten and the Volksgarten, numbering among the few parks within the medieval walls. The former was a botanical garden planned by Johann Georg Scheffner in 1796 and opened west of the church in 1809. The Botanischer Garten was separated from the Volksgarten to the west by the street Steindammer Wallstraße. Located within the Volksgarten were the Königsberg Observatory and the 1877 Kriegerdenkmal, a war memorial honoring soldiers killed during the Franco-Prussian War.

Friedrich Bessel, Theodor Gottlieb von Hippel the Elder, and Franz Ernst Neumann were buried in Neurossgarten's Ehrenfriedhof cemetery.

== Institutes and clinics ==
Many institutes and clinics, especially those affiliated with the University of Königsberg, were located in Neurossgarten and the neighboring quarters of Laak and Steindamm. These included the Geologisches Institut with its Bernstein Museum dedicated to amber, the Chirurgische Klinik, the Augen-Klinik, the Chemisches Laboratorium, the Anatomisches Institut (Anatomie), and the Medizinisches Institut. The latter complex included the Physiologisches Laboratorium, the Pathologisches Klinik, and the Frauen-Klinik.

The original Chemisches Institut opened on Besselstraße in 1833. The chemistry institute was moved to Drummstraße in 1888, the same year the Pathologisches-Pharmakologisches Institut opened on Kopernikus-Straße.
