= Altstadt (Königsberg) =

Coordinates: 54.710°N 20.511°E

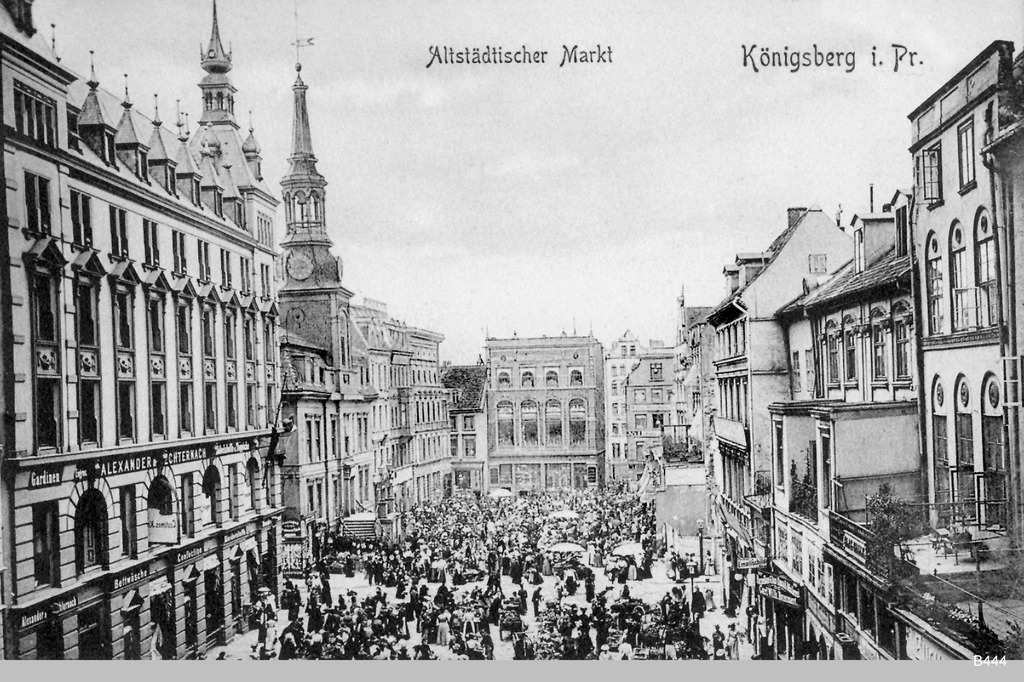
Main Market Square

Altstadt (Polish: Stare Miasto) was a quarter of central Königsberg, Prussia. During the Middle Ages it was the most powerful of the three towns that composed the city of Königsberg, the others being Löbenicht and Kneiphof. Its territory is now part of Kaliningrad, Russia.

== History ==
=== Foundation ===
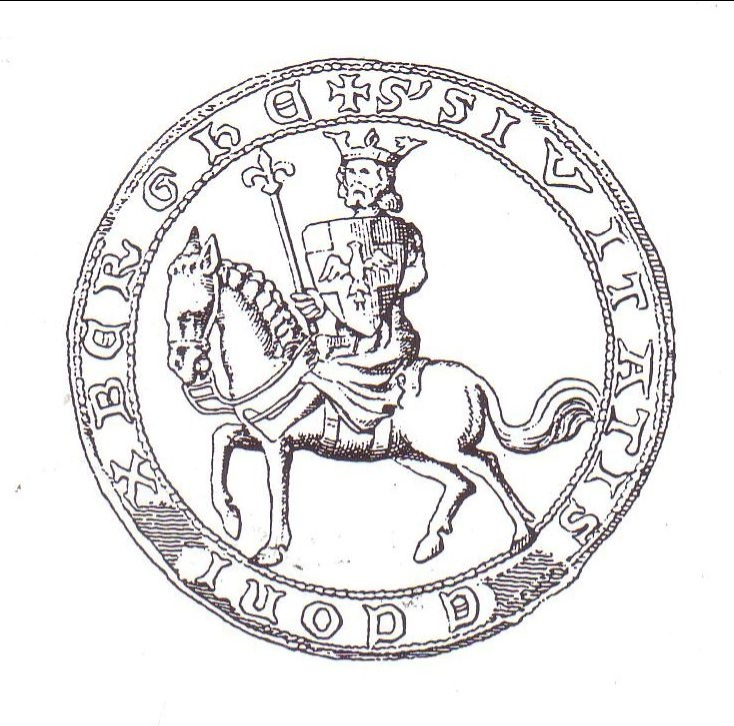
Original seal, depicting King Ottokar II of Bohemia.

Construction of Königsberg Castle began in 1255 during the conquest of Sambia by the Teutonic Knights, part of the Prussian Crusade. An initial settlement was founded north of the castle (later known as Steindamm) the following year, but this was destroyed by Sambians during the 1262 Siege of Königsberg. A new fortified settlement developed south of the castle between it and the Pregel River in 1264. Landmeister Konrad von Thierberg granted the settlement Kulm rights on 12 February or 26 February 1286. Although originally named simply Königsberg, the town became known as Altstadt (German for "old town") to differentiate it from the neighboring Neustädte (new towns) of Löbenicht (1300) and Kneiphof (1327). Each town had its own charter, market rights, church, and fortifications.

While some of the original settlers from 1256 remained to participate in the foundation of Altstadt, a greater number of burghers were brought to the region by the locator Gerko von Dobrin. Most of the newcomers were from Lübeck, Lower Saxony, and Westphalia, with others arriving from Pomerania, Mecklenburg, the Elbe basin, Silesia, and western Prussia. The majority of burghers spoke Low German (later Low Prussian), but the languages of administration were those used by the Teutonic Knights, Latin and Central German.

The oldest remaining seal of Altstadt depicted King Ottokar II of Bohemia, who had led the initial conquest of Sambia and was honored for his participation by having Königsberg named after him. Altstadt's coat of arms depicted a red crown in a white field above a white cross in a red field, with the crown honoring the Bohemian crown and the cross representing honoring the Teutonic Knights. Aside from being the colors of Bohemia, red and white also represented urban freedom. It is unknown when the coat of arms were first adopted. Two lions were added to the arms as supporters in the 17th century.

=== Medieval period ===
Coat of arms

Altstadt, the center of medieval Königsberg, came to be bordered by Kneiphof to the south, Lomse to the southeast, Löbenicht to the east, Königsberg Castle to the north, Steindamm and Neurossgarten to the northwest, Laak to the west, and Lastadie to the southwest. Suburbs under the jurisdiction of Altstadt (Freiheiten) included Hufen, Laak, Lastadie, Lomse, Neurossgarten, and Steindamm. Altstadt's warehouses were located in Lastadie and Lomse. Outlying villages and estates controlled by Altstadt included Kosse, Puschdorf, Stablauken, Steinbeck, Kraußen, Ottenhagen, Ratshubenhof, and Adlig Neuendorf.

A wall was constructed around Altstadt from 1359 to 1370. Because of the narrowness of the town's streets, after 1700 each newly constructed building had to be shortened by two feet to expand street width. The Holzbrücke bridge, constructed by Altstadt in 1404, connected the town to Lomse. Altstadt was connected to Kneiphof by the Krämerbrücke (built 1286), the Dombrücke (built ca. 1330, destroyed 1379), and the Schmiedebrücke (built 1379). A member of the Hanseatic League by 1339, Altstadt took part in the Confederation of Cologne against King Valdemar IV of Denmark in 1367.

One of the streets was called Polnische Gasse (Polish Street) since 1436, indicating that Poles lived there. It was renamed by the Nazis in 1936 to erace traces of Polish presence.

=== Thirteen Years' War ===
Altstadt and Kneiphof sent representatives to the Prussian Confederation in 1440, although Löbenicht did not. As members of the Confederation, the Königsberg towns rebelled against the Teutonic Knights on 4 February 1454 at the beginning of the Thirteen Years' War and allied with King Casimir IV Jagiellon of Poland. The rebellion in Königsberg was supported by the merchant class and led by Old Town's mayor, Andreas Brunau. Based upon the example of Danzig (Gdańsk), Brunau hoped to turn Königsberg into an autonomous city with control over all Sambia. On 19 June Brunau paid fealty to the Polish chancellor, Jan Taszka Koniecpolski, confirming the city's accession to Poland.

However, Brunau and his mercantile allies lost the support of Altstadt and Löbenicht on 24 March 1455 due to spontaneous opposition from craftsmen and workers, with the rebels retreating to Kneiphof. Upon the approach of the forces of Komtur Heinrich Reuß von Plauen, Brunau fled to Danzig. Plauen received homage from Altstadt on 17 April, after which he reaffirmed the town's rights. Besieged from Altstadt and Haberberg, Kneiphof surrendered to Plauen on 14 July. Decorative faces mocking Kneiphof were subsequently added to Altstadt's town hall.

In 1466, the city pressed for the Teutonic Knights to accept Polish peace terms, and the Old Town mayor took part in the peace negotiations. The seals of all three towns were attached to the documents of the peace treaty. Per the treaty it became part of "one and indivisible" Kingdom of Poland as a fief held by the Teutonic Order.

=== Modern era ===
Polish people continued to live within the Old Town. Polish church services were held in the local church from 1618 to 1817.

Altstadt became part of the Kingdom of Prussia in 1701. In the same year the three towns resisted the efforts of Burgfreiheit to form a proposed fourth town, Friedrichsstadt. By the Rathäusliche Reglement of 13 June 1724, King Frederick William I of Prussia merged Altstadt, Löbenicht, Kneiphof, and their respective suburbs into the united city of Königsberg. Königsberg Castle and its suburbs remained separate until the Städteordnung of Stein on 19 November 1808 during the era of Prussian reforms.

Altstadt was devastated by the 1944 Bombing of Königsberg and 1945 Battle of Königsberg. Buildings which survived World War II were subsequently demolished by the Soviet Union.

== Sights ==
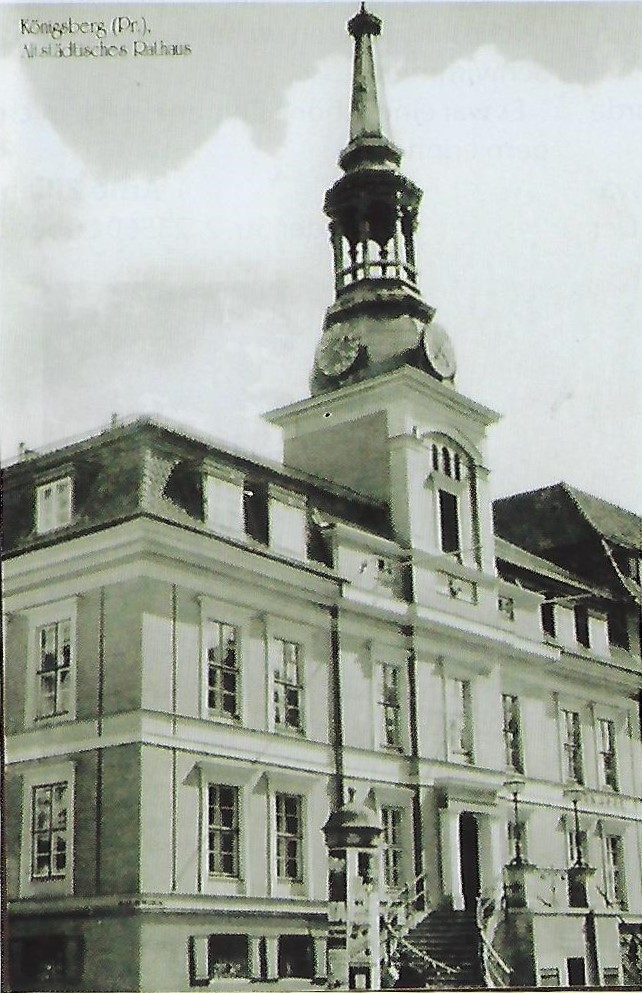
Town Hall

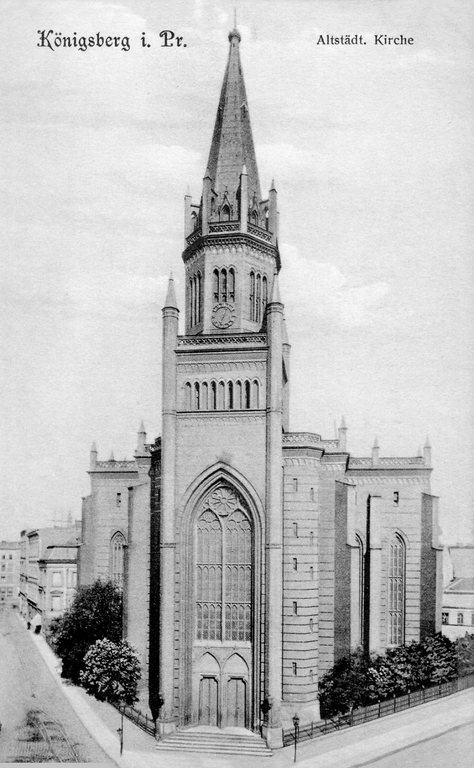
New Church

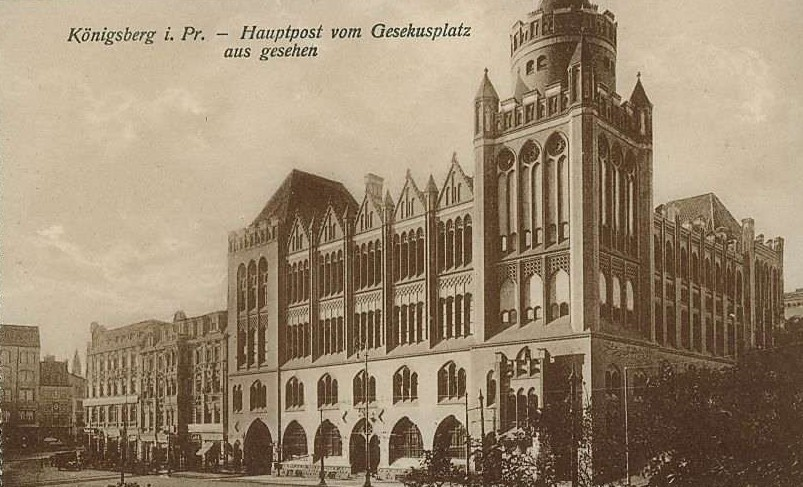
Main post office

The Altstadt Town Hall was located at the town's marketplace. The medieval Altstadt Church was located south of the castle, while the 19th century New Altstadt Church was built further to the north.
