= Jerusalem (Königsberg) =

Coordinates: 54°41′02″N 20°34′27″E

Jerusalem was first a suburban estate and then a quarter of Königsberg, Germany, located southeast of the city center. Its territory is now part of the Moskovsky District of Kaliningrad, Russia.

Jerusalem, named after the ancient city, was founded by the Teutonic Knights as a village along the Alter Pregel River. The vicinity was also once known as the Heiligengeistesfeld (Holy Ghost Field). Heinrich Reuß von Plauen established a semi-circular sconce with trenches to protect the estate in the 15th century. The estate was in the possession of Löbenicht's hospital during the 16th century.

Development of Jerusalem intensified during the 1920s. The village and estate were incorporated into the city of Königsberg in 1928. Nearby suburban quarters were Rosenau to the west, Seligenfeld to the south, and Adlig Neuendorf to the east.
