= Rosenau (Königsberg) =

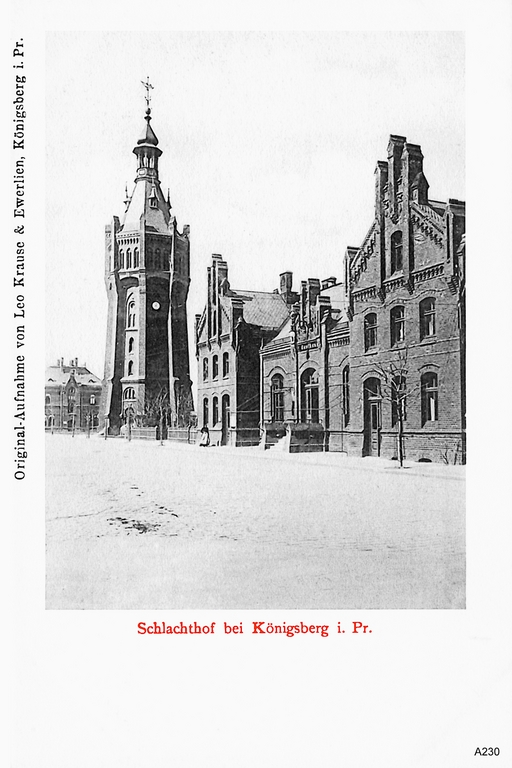
Schlacht- und Viehhof

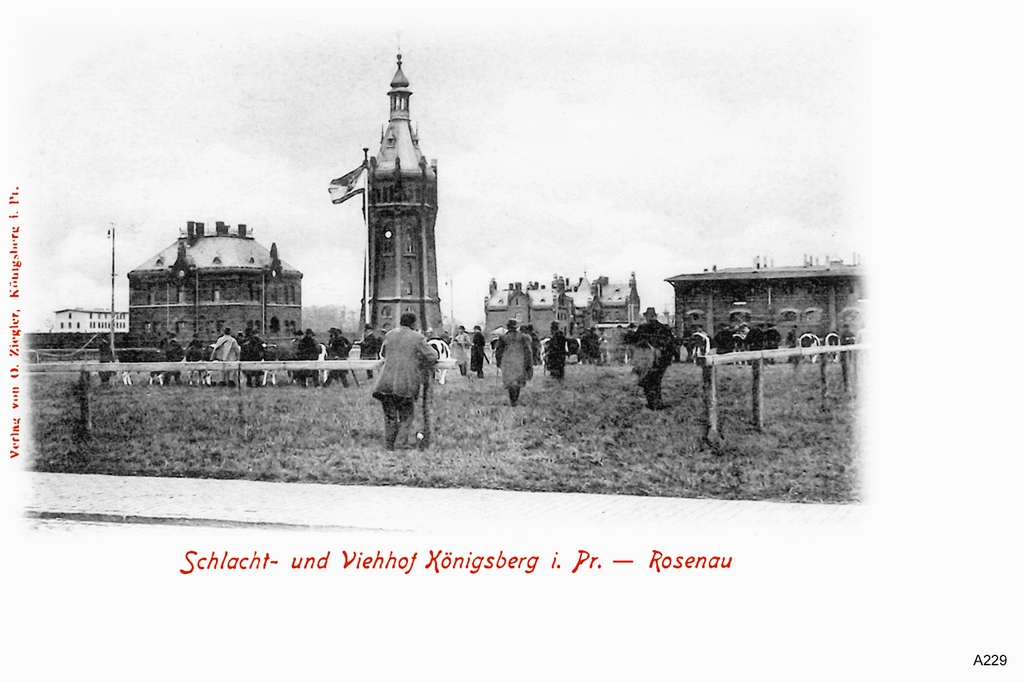
Schlacht- und Viehhof

Rosenau was first a suburb of and then a quarter of Königsberg, Germany, located south of the city center. Its territory is now part of the Moskovsky District of Kaliningrad, Russia.

The estate Rosenau, originally known as Kneiphöfischer Ratshof in comparison to Altstädtischer Ratshof, was sold by Hans Simon of Aweiden to the council of Kneiphof in 1540. The estate was worked by farmers from Schönfliess and Nasser Garten.

The last owners of the estate were the Schulte-Heuthaus family. Rosenau was incorporated into Königsberg in 1908. It was connected to Mühlenhof to the north and Speichersdorf to the south by Aweider Allee. Ponarth was to the west. The Sportplatz am Friedländer Tor was a stadium located to Rosenau's northwest.

Rosenau developed into a working class suburb after Königsberg was connected to the railroad. In 1895, the Königsberg building councillor Mühlbach led the construction of the Schlacht- und Viehhof, a modern slaughterhouse. From 1905 to 1906 it was expanded further. Hugo Stinnes founded the Odinwerk, one of the largest factories and foundries of eastern Germany. Rosenau Church served as the quarter's Protestant church.
