= Dalneye Microdistrict =

District in Kaliningrad, Russia

Coordinates: 54°39′50″N 20°34′10″E

Dalneye (Russian: Дальнее) is a residential area in Moskovsky District of the city of Kaliningrad, Russia. It was formerly known by its German name Seligenfeld as first a suburb of and then a quarter of Königsberg, Germany, located southeast of the city center.

== History ==
The village of Seligenfeld, located east of Schönfliess and south of Jerusalem, was first documented in 1395. It was granted to the Benedictine convent in Löbenicht in 1465.

Seligenfeld's one-nave church was renovated in 1693, but burned down in 1845 after a lightning strike. The rebuilt church contained a paneled, wooden ceiling with wooden pillars, as well as two bells.

The fort XI Dönhoff, named in 1894, was built near Seligenfeld as part of the new Königsberg fortifications constructed from 1872 to 1894. The village was incorporated into the city of Königsberg in 1939. Königsberg became Russian Kaliningrad following World War II.
