= Adolf Lesser =

German physician

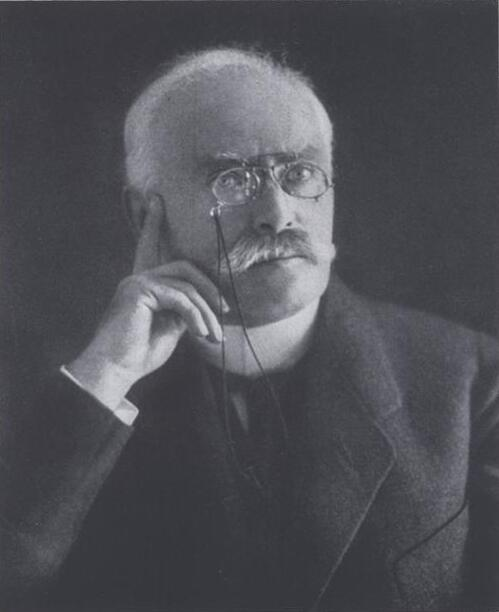
- Born: 22 May 1851; Preußisch Stargard, Kreis Preußisch Stargard, Kingdom of Prussia
- Died: 6 July 1926 (aged 75); Breslau, Province of Lower Silesia, Weimar Republic
- Education: University of Breslau
- Organization: German National Academy of Sciences Leopoldina
- Spouse: Mina Kopp
- Children: 2

Signature
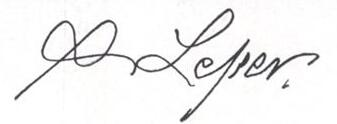

Adolf Lesser (22 May 1851 – 6 July 1926) was a German physician who specialized in forensic medicine. He was born in the city of Stargard, West Prussia.

Lesser studied medicine at the University of Berlin, and from 1877 to 1884 was an assistant at the institute of pharmacology in Berlin. In 1886, he was appointed city physician (Stadtphysikus) in Breslau, and during the following year became an associate professor at the University of Breslau. He remained at Breslau until his retirement in 1921.

He was the author of numerous articles in medical journals, his best known written work being the 1892 Atlas der Gerichtlichen Medizin (Atlas of Forensic Medicine).
