= Ludwig von Baczko =

German author and historian (1756–1823)

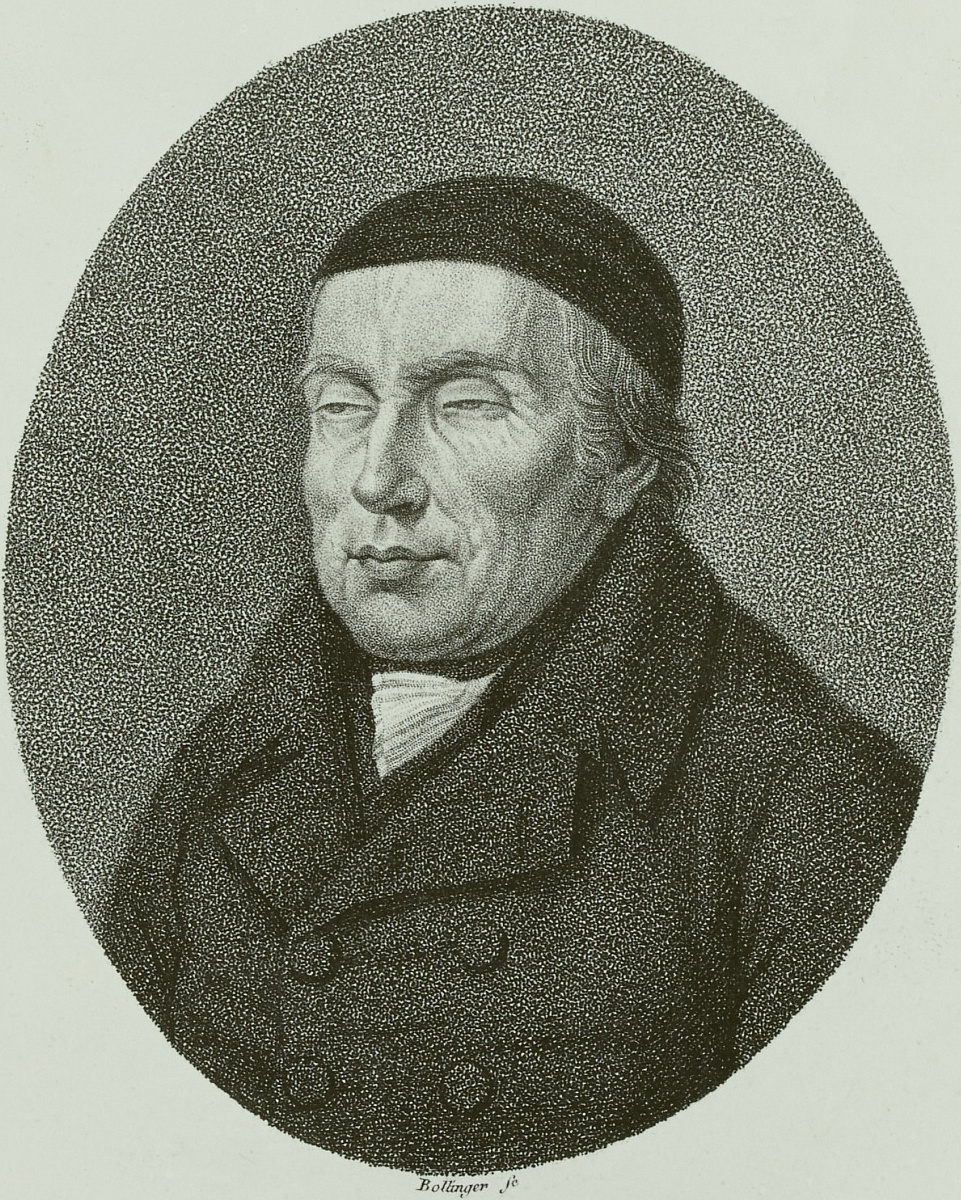
- Portrait by Friedrich Wilhelm Bollinger (1824)
- Born: June 8, 1756; Lyck, Masuria
- Died: March 27, 1823 (aged 66); Königsberg

Ludwig Franz Adolf Josef von Baczko (8 June 1756 – 27 March 1823) was a German writer.
