= Bombing of Königsberg in World War II =

Bombing of Königsberg
- Part of World War II
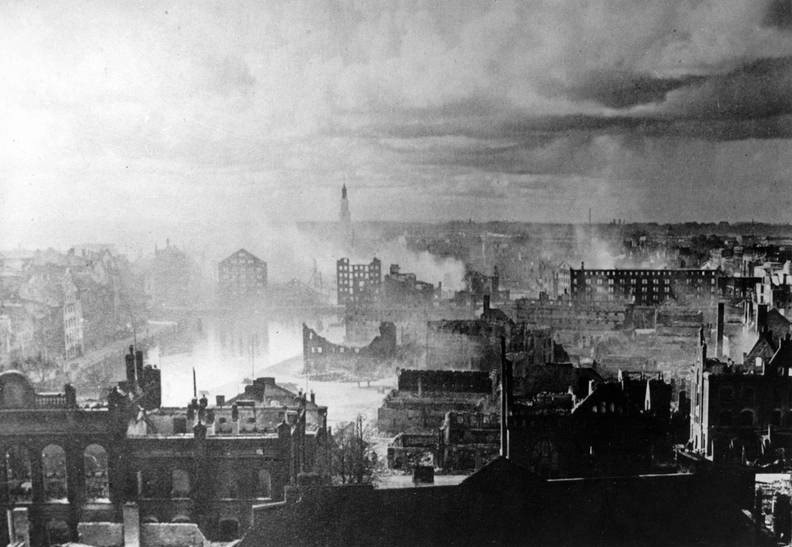
- Ruins of Königsberg, end of August 1944
| Date | 1 September 1941 – 9 April 1945 |
| Location | Königsberg, Nazi Germany |

Belligerents
| United Kingdom; Soviet Union | (Nazi Germany) Germany |

The bombing of Königsberg was a series of attacks made on the city of Königsberg in East Prussia during World War II. The Soviet Air Force had made several raids on the city since 1941. Extensive attacks carried out by RAF Bomber Command destroyed most of the city's historic quarters in the summer of 1944. Königsberg was also heavily bombed during the Battle of Königsberg, in the final weeks of the war.

== First Soviet air raids ==
With the aim of retaliation for German airstrikes on the capital of the USSR, Moscow, in 1941, Joseph Stalin ordered the Soviet Air Force to bomb Königsberg. Eleven Pe-8 bombers attacked the city on 1 September 1941. The Soviets did not lose a single bomber in the raid. The Soviet Air Force bombed the city again on 26 July 1942, 27 August 1942 and 15 July 1943. On the night of 28 April 1943, a bomber dropped a 5,000-kilogram (11,000 lb) bomb on the city's area, the largest bomb in the Soviet inventory.

== British air raids ==
No. 5 Group carried out the first RAF attack on Königsberg on the night of 26/27 August 1944, using 174 Avro Lancasters. The target, which was at the extreme range for the planes, demanded a round trip of 3,100 kilometres (1,900 mi) from bases in England. Planes from RAF Skellingthorpe (Lincolnshire) could not return to base and diverted to RAF Tain in northern Scotland after 10 hours and 35 minutes' flying time. (Note: cf. 11 hours and 20 minutes' return to base three days later.) Despite losing only four aircraft, the first attack was not particularly successful because most bombs fell on the eastern side of Königsberg, missing the city centre.

The next RAF raid occurred three days later on the 29/30 August. This time No. 5 Group dropped 490 tonnes (1.1 million pounds) of high explosive and incendiaries on the centre of the city. RAF Bomber Command estimated that 20% of industry and 41% of all the housing in Königsberg was destroyed. Out of a force of 189 Lancasters, German night fighters shot down 15 RAF bombers. The historic city centre suffered severe damage and the districts of Altstadt, Löbenicht, and Kneiphof were nearly destroyed. The city's 14th-century cathedral was reduced to a shell. Extensive damage was also done to the castle, all churches in the old city, the university, and the old shipping quarter.

== The Battle of Königsberg ==
In 1945, the prolonged battle of Königsberg inflicted further damage. When the Soviets occupied the city in April 1945, more than 90% of the city was already destroyed. Under Soviet occupation, the surviving, much reduced German population was forcibly expelled from the city. It was then rebuilt as the Soviet Union city of Kaliningrad.
