= Handelshochschule Königsberg =

Defunct business school in Germany

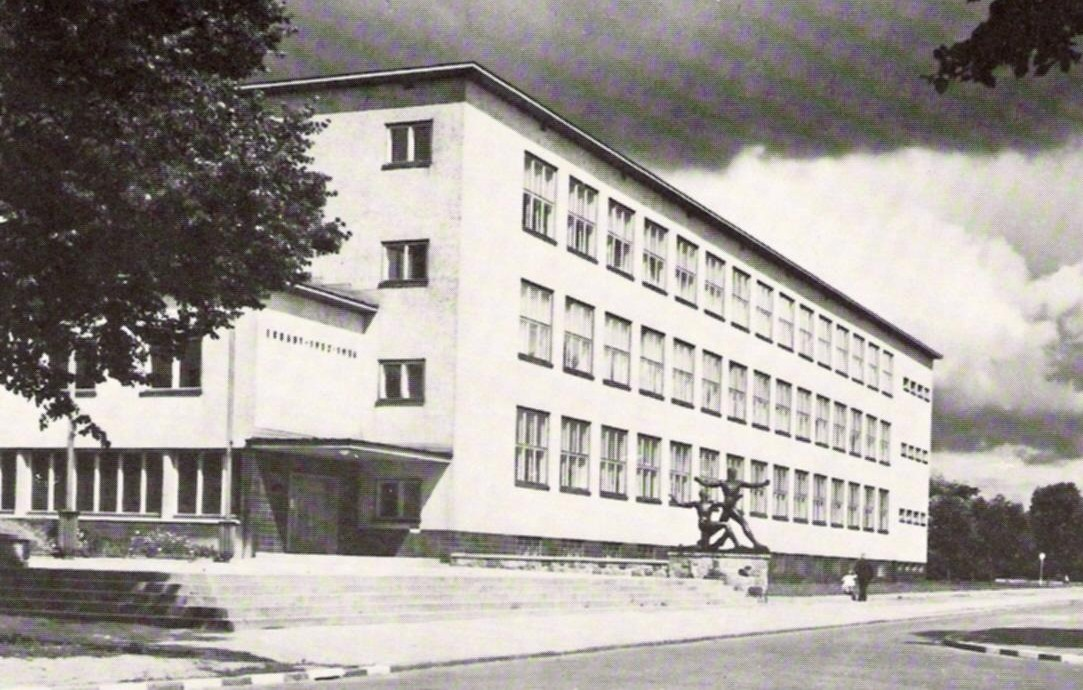
- Handelshochschule Königsberg in 1938
- Type: Business school
- Established: April 1, 1907
- Founders: Paul Stettiner and Theodor Krohne
- Academic staff: 9
- Administrative staff: 28
- Students: 234
- Location: Königsberg, Germany

Handelshochschule Königsberg was a business school in Königsberg, Germany. The structure is now used by the Immanuel Kant Baltic Federal University (IKBFU) in Kaliningrad, Russia.

== History ==
Begun through the efforts of the officials Paul Stettiner and Theodor Krohne, business courses were originally held in the Altstadt Town Hall on 1 April 1907. Its instructors included professors from the University of Königsberg, lawyers, and merchants. By 1915 the town hall contained a business school, which moved to the former Steindammer Schule on Tragheim's 1. Fließstraße in 1924.

Because the school had grown to include 600 students by 1928, plans were made for a new building in Tragheimsdorf near the Oberteich. It was designed by the architect Hans Malwitz. The foundation stone for the new three-storied building was laid by Prime Minister Otto Braun on 24 November 1930, with construction costing 1,113,000 RM.

The Handelshochschule was the only business school of pre-war eastern Germany. By 1937/38 the Handelshochschule had 9 professors, 28 docents, 234 enrolled students, and 88 guest students. In 1939 its library contained 47,000 volumes. While it focused on the economy of East Prussia, the school also studied and had excursions with neighboring countries.

The Handelshochschule sent much of its material to Schlawe (Sławno) in Fall 1944 during World War II, but it was captured by the advancing Red Army in Spring 1945. The school's personnel fled Königsberg in February 1945, travelling first to Greifswald and then to Erlangen. The traditions of the defunct Handelshochschule were adopted by the University of Mannheim in the 1960s. Professor Fritz Urbschat wrote a history of the Handelshochschule in 1962.

The facility of the former German school was used as the administrative building of Kaliningrad's new technical college starting in 1946. It was acquired by the IKBFU in 2012.
