= Christuskirche, Königsberg =

Coordinates: 54°43′18″N 20°30′39″E

Christuskirche
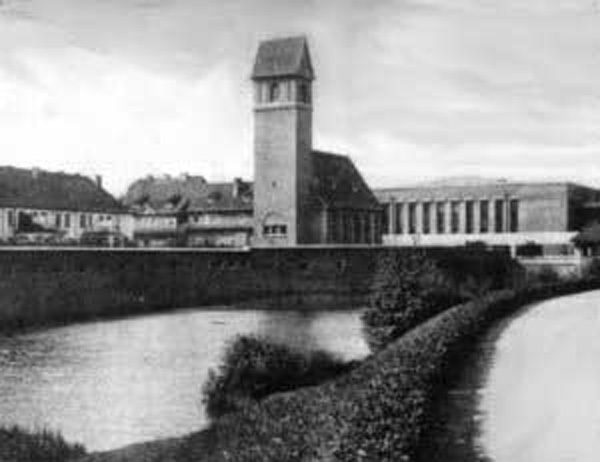
- Christuskirche
- Country: Germany
- Denomination: Lutheran

History
- Consecrated: 1926

Architecture
- Years built: 1924-1926
- Completed: 1926
- Demolished: 1960

The Christuskirche (Christ Church) was a Protestant church in northern Königsberg, Germany.

Construction of the church began in 1924, with its dedication occurring on 8 August 1926. It was built near the intersection of Wallring and Dessauer Straße in northern Tragheim; to the west was the Haus der Technik and to the east was the Kunsthalle.

The church was heavily damaged by the 1944 Bombing of Königsberg and 1945 Battle of Königsberg. Its ruins were demolished by 1960. A shopping centre has been built in its place in Kaliningrad, Russia.
