= Kunsthalle Königsberg =

Museum in Germany

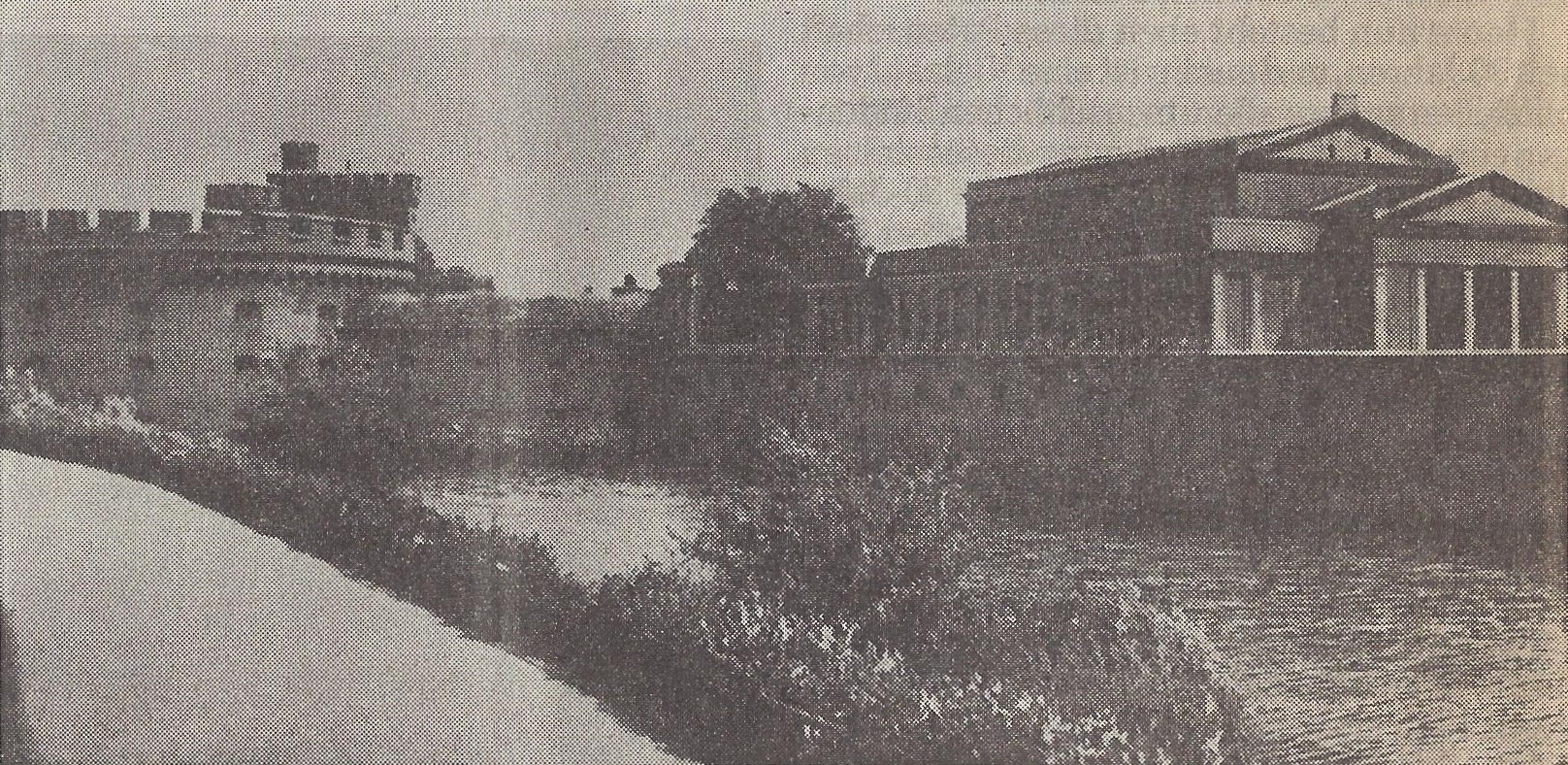
Wrangelturm and Kunsthalle in Königsberg

The Kunsthalle Königsberg was an art museum (Kunsthalle) in Königsberg.

Eduard Anderson, head of Königsberg's art association (Kunstverein), led the efforts to establish an exhibition hall in the city. A total of 80,000 Mark was collected, with 5,000 Mark raised by councilor Minkowski, commerce councilor F. Heumann, and court photographer Gottheil, and the remainder contributed by the city. The museum was designed by Friedrich Lahrs, who also planned the Kunstakademie.

The neoclassical Kunsthalle was located on Wallring between Tragheim and Tragheimsdorf and built from 1912 to 1913 near dismantled city walls. Nearby was the Wrangel Tower (Wrangelturm, named after Friedrich Graf von Wrangel), the Oberteich, and the Ostmesse. Because of its proximity to the Wrangel Tower, the art museum was also known as the Kunsthalle am Wrangelturm. Its opening exhibition in 1913 was organized by Adalbert Bezzenberger and dedicated to the Kingdom of Prussia's liberation in 1813 during the War of the Sixth Coalition.

The Kunsthalle was used by the German Army's postal service during World War I; exhibitions were held instead at the Königsberg Stock Exchange. In 1924 the museum was transferred from the art association to the city.

The building was damaged by Bombing of Königsberg in World War II, but survived the war. However, it fell into disuse following the change of German Königsberg to Russian Kaliningrad. It was used for storage in 1951 and as a school by 1985. In the 21st century it has been used as a market.
