= Victory Square, Kaliningrad =

Square in Kaliningrad, Russia

Coordinates: 54°43′12″N 20°30′3″E

Victory Square (Russian: Площадь победы, Ploshchad Pobedy) is the central square in Kaliningrad, Russia.

Prior to 1945, the square was part of Königsberg, Germany. Steindamm Gate, part of the city's northwestern Baroque city walls, was dismantled in 1912 to allow development of the area between Steindamm and the Hufen suburbs. The road leading from central Königsberg to Mittelhufen was known first as Kaiser-Wilhelm-Damm in honor of Wilhelm II, German Emperor. After the abdication of the House of Hohenzollern in 1918, the road was renamed to Hansaring and the prominent square nearby to Hansaplatz, honoring the city's participation in the Hanseatic League from 1339-1579. The square was then renamed Adolf-Hitler-Platz in 1934 to honor the Nazi leader. East of the square were the grounds of the Ostmesse trade fair. Königsberg was transferred to the Soviet Union in 1945 and then renamed Kaliningrad.

While most of central Königsberg was destroyed during World War II, the northern suburban area around the square survived intact. Post-war Kaliningrad developed around the square, which was renamed Victory Square to honor the Soviet victory. Many banks, shops, malls, and the city government are in the vicinity of the square. The Kaliningrad Severny railway station, formerly the Königsberg Nordbahnhof built in 1930, is a business centre. The Handelshof or Stadthaus, built by Hanns Hopp in 1923, still functions as the seat of the city administration as Kaliningrad City Hall. Kaliningrad State Technical University is located in the former provincial court, while the FSB have offices in the former police headquarters.

During the celebration of the 750th anniversary of the founding of the city in 2005 the square was thoroughly renovated. A new fountain with the triumph column was placed in the centre and the new Cathedral of Christ the Saviour was consecrated in the same year. The statue of Lenin, previously in front of the cathedral, was removed from the square and placed at another site in Kaliningrad in 2006.

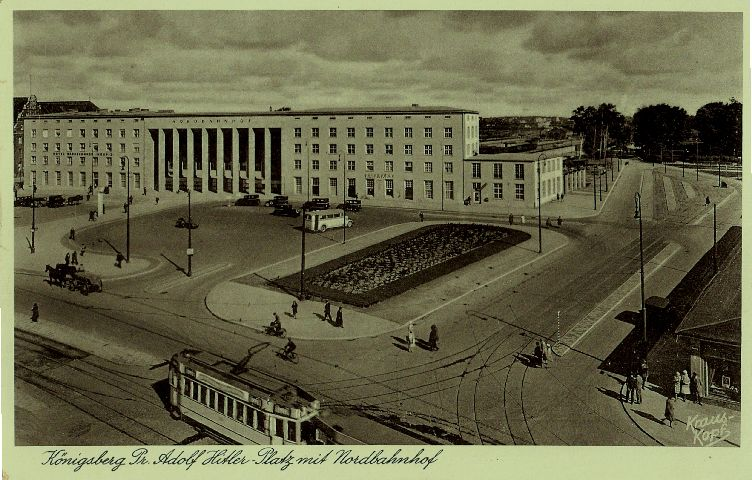
Hansaplatz in Königsberg with the North railway station, ca. 1942

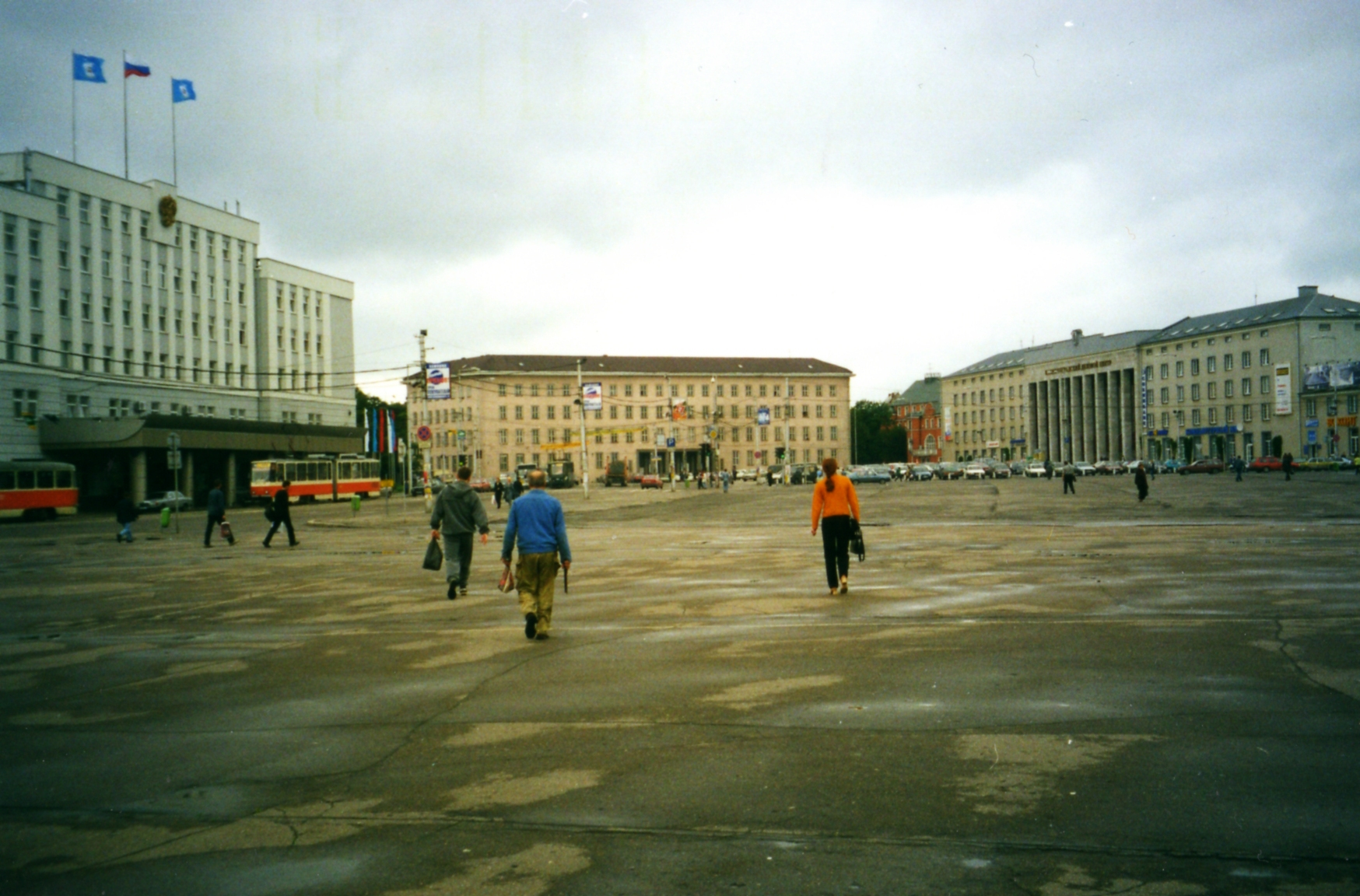
Ploshchad Pobedy with the North railway station building in 2002

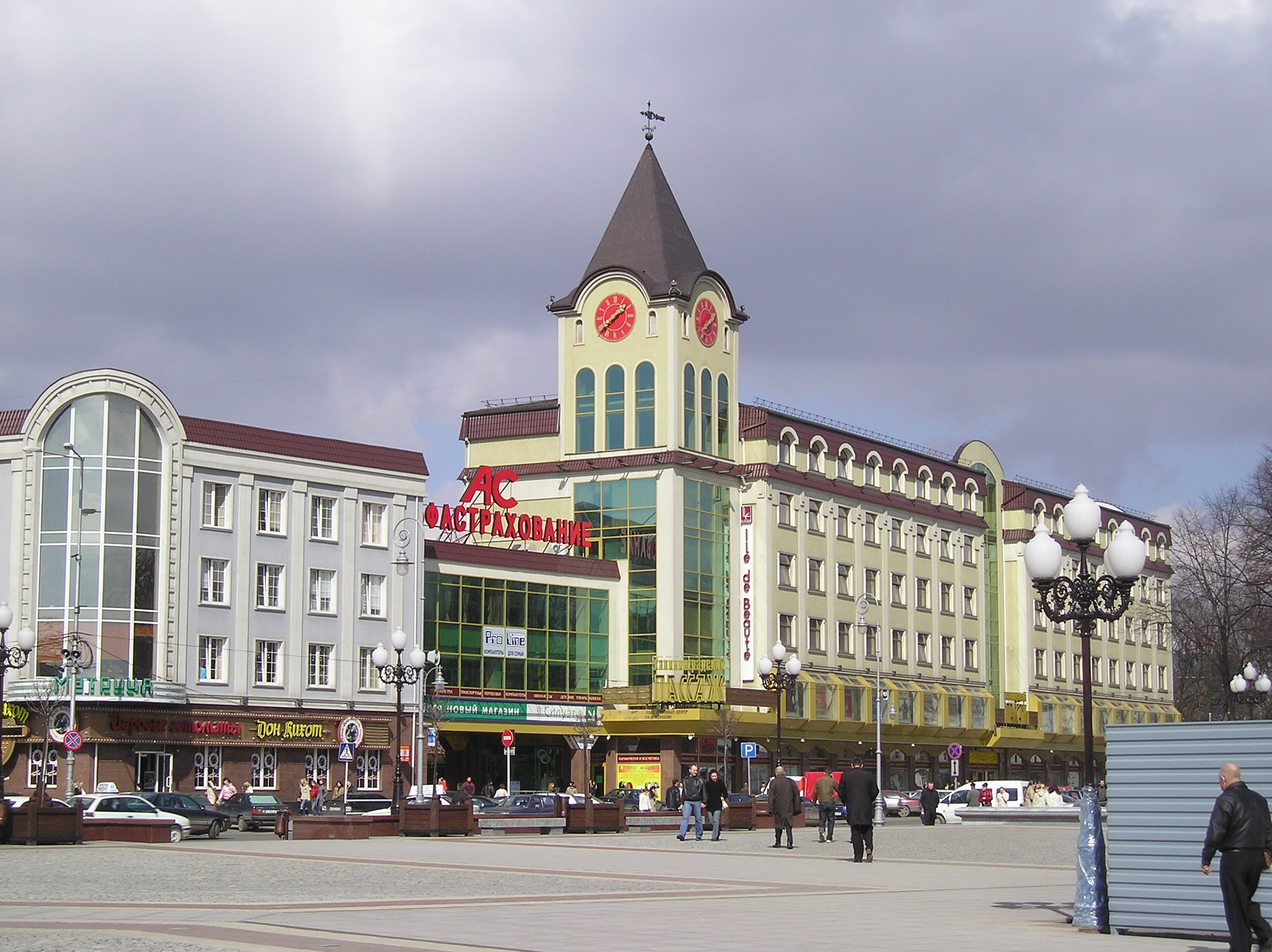
Shopping centre "Kaliningrad Passage" in 2006

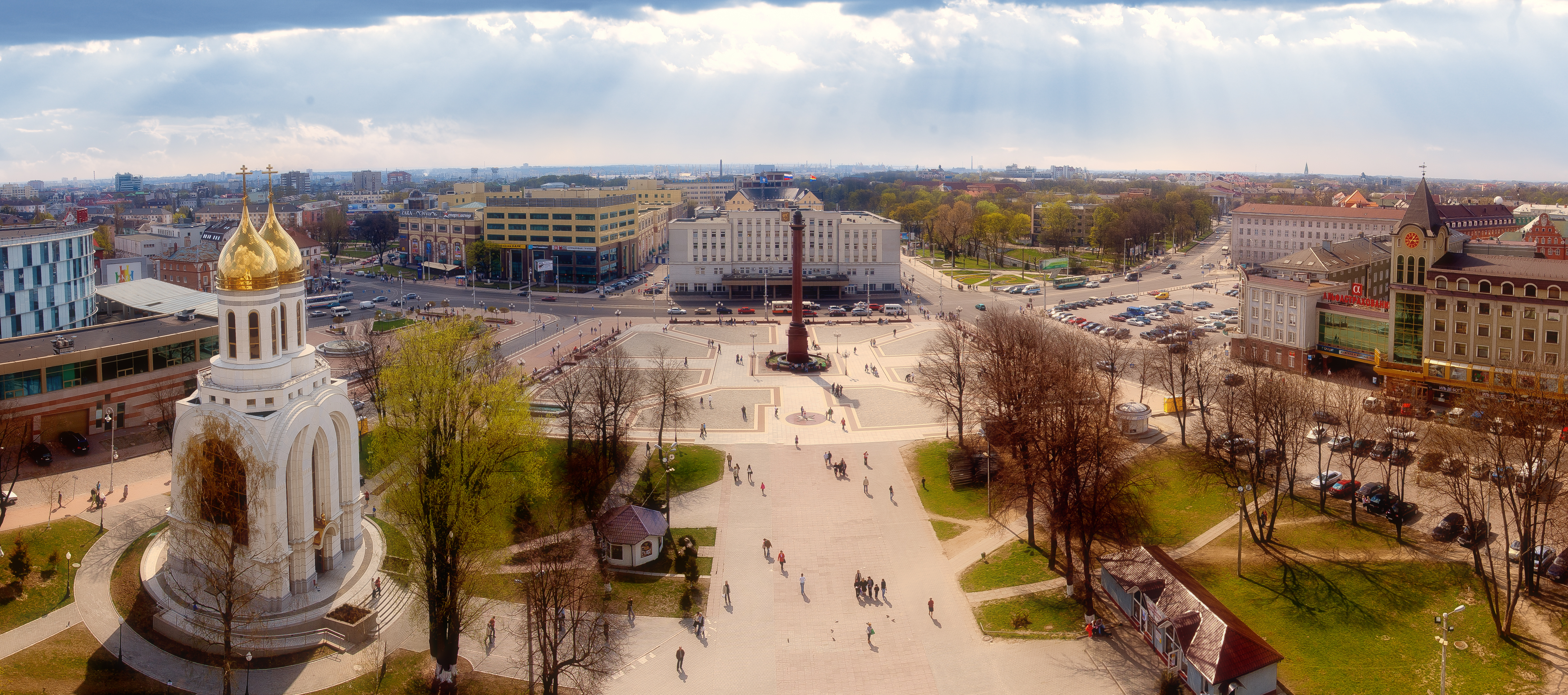
View from the Cathedral of Christ the Saviour in 2011

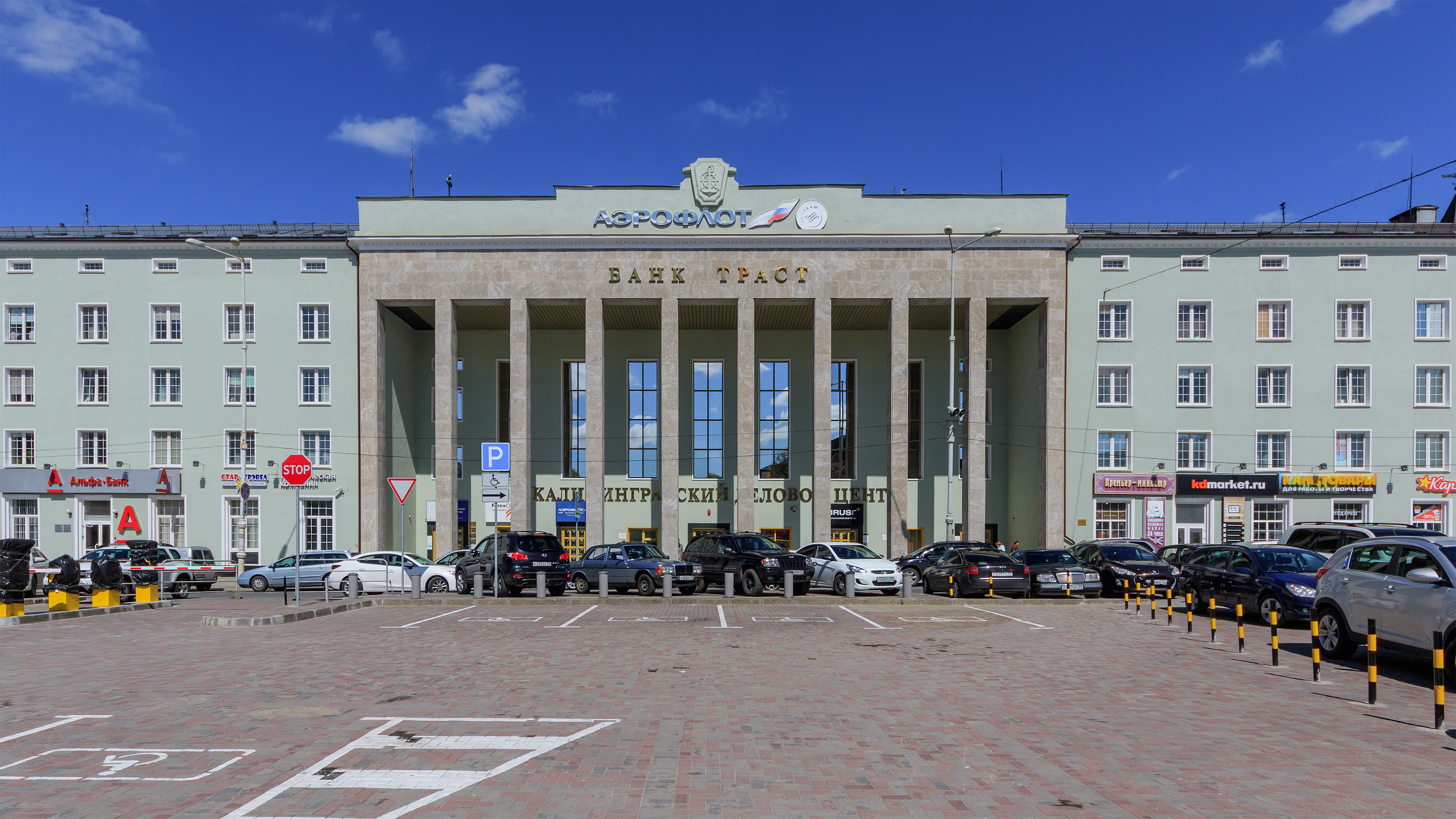
Aeroflot office in 2017

== Sources ==
- Rainer Eisenschmid: Baltikum. Baedeker 2001, page 454 (Online preview with Google Books)
- Gause, Fritz (1968). Die Geschichte der Stadt Königsberg. Band II: Von der Königskrönung bis zum Ausbruch des Ersten Weltkriegs (in German). Köln: Böhlau Verlag. p. 761.
- Information about Kaliningrad
- Photos and information about Kaliningrad
- Article about the square on Russland-Aktuell
