= Hindenburg =

Hindenburg may refer to:

== People ==
- Paul von Hindenburg (1847–1934), German general in World War I and president of Germany (1925–1934)
  - Gertrud von Hindenburg (1860–1921), German noblewoman, wife of Paul von Hindenburg
  - Oskar von Hindenburg (1883–1960), German officer, son of Paul von Hindenburg
- Carl Hindenburg (1741–1808), mathematician

== Vessels ==
- LZ 129 Hindenburg, a 1936 German airship involved in a disaster
  - Hindenburg disaster
  - Hindenburg-class airships
- Hindenburg (icebreaker)
- SMS Hindenburg, a 1917 battlecruiser built for the Imperial German Navy
- SS Columbus or SS Hindenburg, a German liner

== Film and television ==
- The Hindenburg (film), the 1975 film
- Hindenburg: The Untold Story, a 2007 television docudrama

== Places ==
- Hindenburg, a village in Templin, Brandenburg, Germany
- Hindenburg, Saxony-Anhalt, a village in Stendal, Saxony-Anhalt, Germany
- Hindenburg Range, a mountain range in Papua New Guinea
- Hindenburg O.S., former name of Zabrze, Poland

== See also ==
- Hindenburg, a DC Comics character and member of the Superior Five
- Hindenburg Bridge, a former railway bridge over the Rhine river destroyed in World War II
- Hindenburg Cup, a German aviation prize established in 1928
- Hindenburg Kaserne, a former military base near Würzburg, Franconia, Germany
- Hindenburg light, form of lighting used in the trenches during World War I
- Hindenburg Line, a German defensive line on the Western front during World War I
- Hindenburg-Oberrealschule, a former school in Königsberg, Germany
- Hindenburg Omen, a proposed term in technical analysis of stock prices
- Hindenburg Programme, a German armament program during World War I
- Hindenburgdamm, a rail causeway linking northern Germany to the island of Sylt
- Hindenburg Research, a financial activist firm that specializes in releasing short-seller reports
