= Maraunenhof =

Coordinates: 54°44′01″N 20°31′12″E

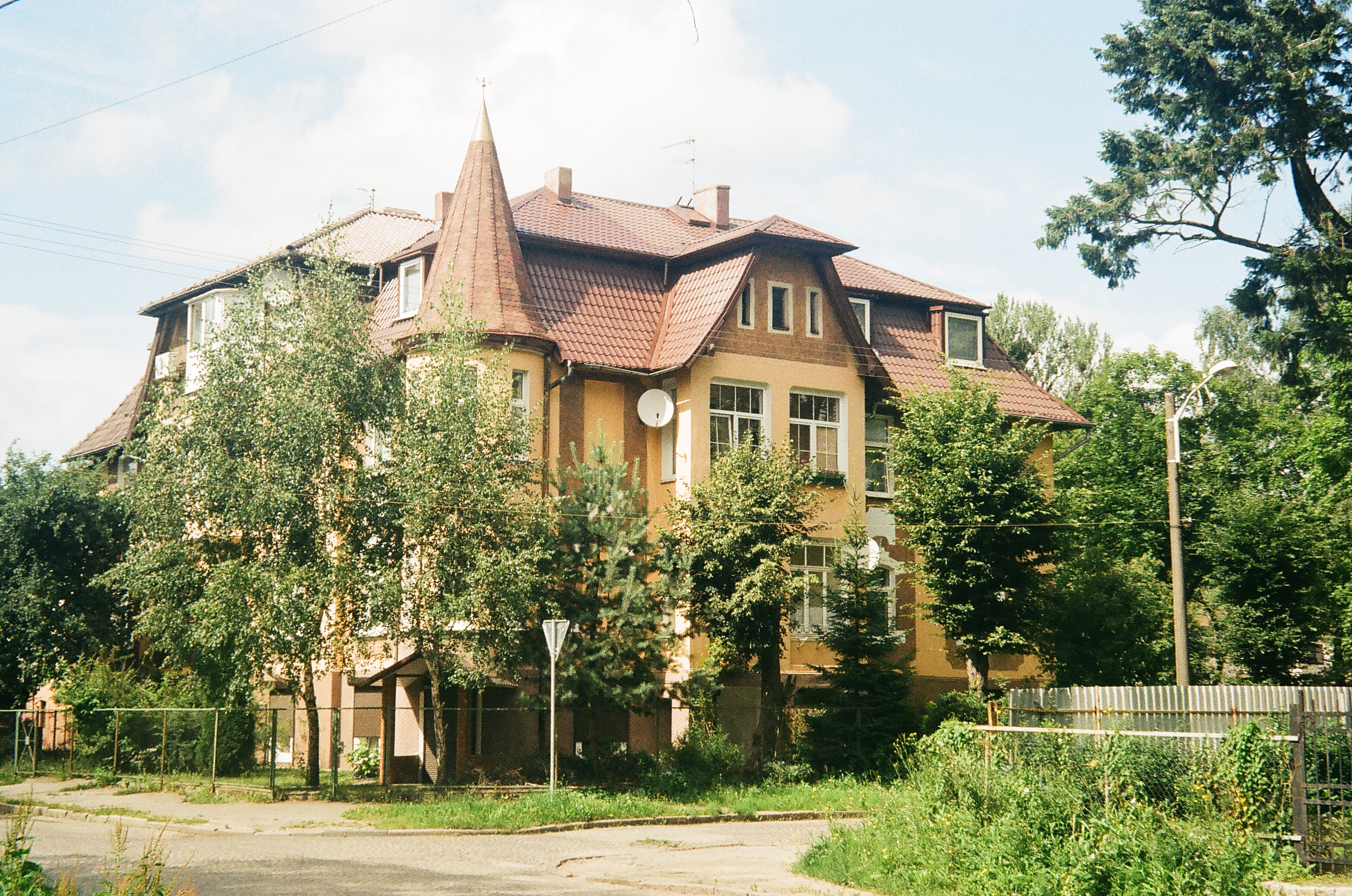
Villa in Maraunenhof, 2011

Maraunenhof was a suburban quarter of northern Königsberg, Germany. Its territory is now part of the Leningradsky District of Kaliningrad, Russia.

== History ==
The estate Maraunenhof, originally Maraunen, was located in the forest west of the Oberteich and north of Tragheim since 1571. It was named after an Old Prussian farmer named Maraun, who acquired the land from Löbenicht in 1605. In 1651 it was reacquired by Löbenicht. In 1798 it was documented as the Gasthaus Maraunenhof.

Part of the estate of Maraunenhof was transferred from the rural district of Königsberg (Landkreis Königsberg i. Pr.) into the city of Königsberg (Stadtkreis Königsberg i. Pr) on 1 April 1905, with the remainder following on 10 June 1927. A break was made in Königsberg's city walls near the Wrangel Tower (Wrangelturm) in 1906 to allow construction of a road north through Tragheimsdorf to Maraunenhof. The Königsberger Terrain-Aktiengesellschaft Oberteich-Marauenhof, a private development company, built Maraunenhof into a suburb of upper class villas along the northern shore of the Oberteich ca. 1911. Parks in Maraunenhof included Max-Aschmann-Park, named after the merchant Max Aschmann, and the scenic Stadtgärtnerei, established by Garden Inspector Paul Käber (1869–1919).

The quarter's mostly Protestant residents attended the Herzog-Albrecht-Gedächtniskirche at König-Ottokar-platz, named after King Ottokar II of Bohemia; in 1934 the square was renamed Herzog-Albrecht-Platz after Albert, Duke of Prussia. In 1935 a military hospital was opened near Max-Aschmann-Park for Königsberg's garrison. The quarter Tragheimer Palve developed just west of Maraunenhof.

The football club VfB Königsberg played its home games at the Sportplatz des Vereins für Bewegungs Spiele near the Stadtgärtnerei, aside from 1940 to 1941 when they played at the Sportplatz am Friedländer Tor between Haberberg and Rosenau. The women's athletic club Königsberger Damen Sportverein also played along Aschmannallee in Maraunenhof.

While most of Königsberg was heavily damaged by the 1944 Bombing of Königsberg and the 1945 Battle of Königsberg, Maraunenhof was relatively unscathed by World War II.
