= Rossgarten Gate =

Historical city gate in Kaliningrad, Russia

Coordinates: 54°43′19″N 20°31′27″E

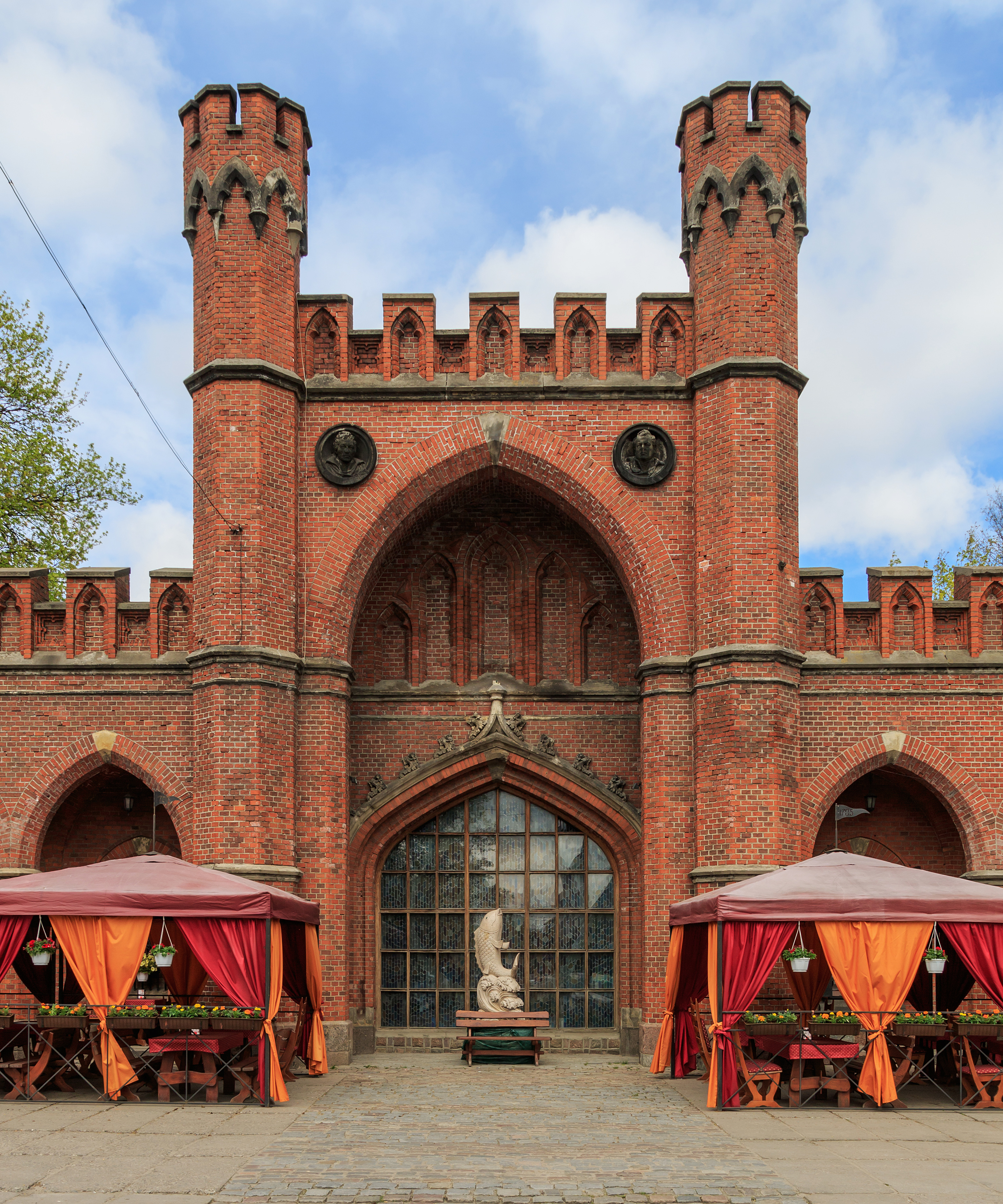
The Rossgarten Gate in 2017.

The Rossgarten Gate (Russian: Росгартенские ворота, tr.: Rosgartenskie vorota; German: Roßgärter Tor) is one of seven surviving city gates of Kaliningrad, Russia, formerly the German city of Königsberg. It is located at the intersection of Chernyakhovskogo street and Alexander Nevsky street, near the Vasilevskiy square and the Kaliningrad Amber Museum.

== History ==
Named after the district Rossgarten, the current gate replaced a previous version of the gate from the beginning of the 17th century. It was constructed between 1852 and 1855 under the supervision of Wilhelm Ludwig Stürmer. The gate was damaged after the war, but restored afterwards and currently houses a café-restaurant called Solnetsnyy Kamen ("Solar Stone").

== Architecture ==
The gate consists of only one passage of about four meters wide. On both sides of the passage three casemates are located, so the gate in total has seven openings. On top of the facade of the gate can be found a series of merlons, divided into two parts by the central elevated part of the gate. The gate itself has two high octagonal turrets. Above the main arch of the gate a lookout area is situated, again equipped with merlons. Reliefs of the Prussian generals Gerhard von Scharnhorst and August Neidhardt von Gneisenau decorate the main arch. While the city side of the gate is a highly decorated, the outer side does not have any decorative ornaments.
