= Hanns Hopp =

The former Park Hotel, Kaliningrad in 1999

The former Handelshof was rebuilt after the War, and has been used by the Kaliningrad local government. Photo from May 2006

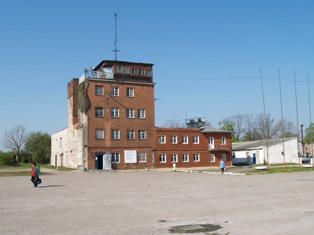
The main building of the former Königsberg Devau Airport in May 2006

Hanns Hopp (9 February 1890 – 21 February 1971) was a German architect.

Hopp was born in Lübeck and studied at the University of Karlsruhe and the Technical University of Munich. From 1918 he was employed as an architect for the local authorities in Königsberg (now Kaliningrad), and from 1920 for the Deutsche Ostmesse, or Eastern Fair. From 1926 he worked as a private architect in Königsberg. In 1944 Hopp left Königsberg and settled in Dresden, continuing his professional career in East Germany (the German Democratic Republic). Between 1952 and 1966 he was President of the Deutsche Bauakademie, the national academy of architecture and construction. He died in 1971 in East Berlin.

== Works ==
He was the architect of several major public and private buildings erected in Königsberg in the 1920s under the supreme mayor, Hans Lohmeyer, including:

- The airport at Königsberg Devau (1921)
- The Handelshof (1922–1923)
- The "Haus der Technik" (1924–1925)
- The Park Hotel, Königsberg (1930–1931)

Several of the buildings erected in Königsberg by Hopp still exist. The main building of the airport at Königsberg Devau is partly in use for the Kaliningrad Sport Aviation Club. The Park Hotel is among the few pre-war German buildings to have survived in the area surrounding the former Castle Pond (Schlossteich). The building is today used by a business enterprise. The ruin of the "Haus der Technik" was rebuilt in the late 1990s, and is currently in use as a business center. The Handelshof is now Kaliningrad City Hall.

== See also ==
- Architecture of Leipzig - Stalinist Architecture from 1951
