= Haus der Technik =

Shopping mall in Kaliningrad, Russia

- Haus der technik, Дом техники
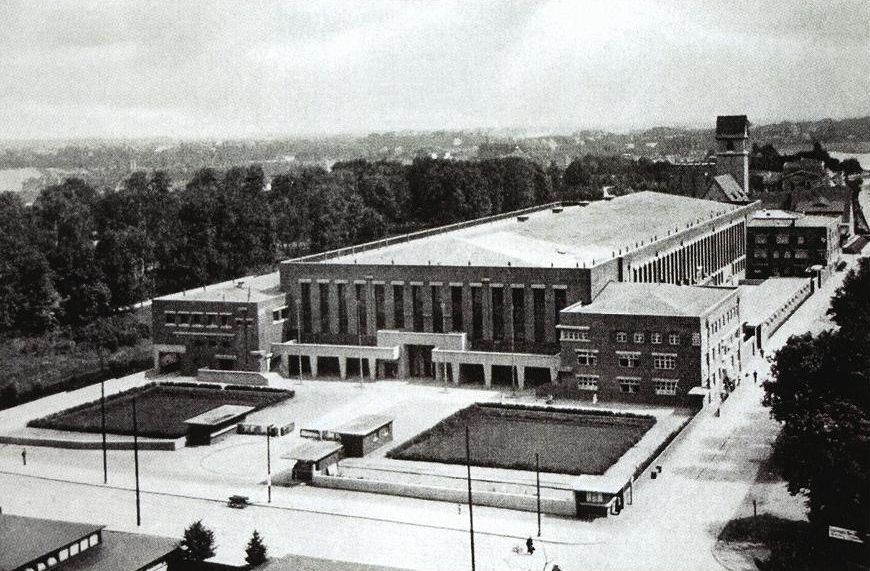
- Interactive map of the Haus der Technik area

General information
- Architectural style: Expressionism
- Coordinates: 54.7215°N 20.5093°E
- Year built: 1924-1925

Design and construction
- Architect: Hanns Hopp

The Haus der Technik was an exhibition hall in Königsberg, Germany, now Kaliningrad, Russia.

Constructed from 1924 to 1925 by Hanns Hopp along Waldburgstraße / Wallring between Tragheim and Tragheimsdorf, the brick hall was used to display machinery as part of the Ostmesse trade fair. Its massive hall was larger in size than even the Muscovite Hall in Königsberg Castle. The Nazis renamed it the "Schlageterhaus", after Albert Leo Schlageter, from 1933 to 1945.

The hall's roof was destroyed during World War II. The building and its vicinity were acquired by an investment company in 2004 and have been converted to commercial use in Kaliningrad. The building was restored from 2004 to 2006, and is now in use as a shopping center called "Epicenter".

== Gallery ==
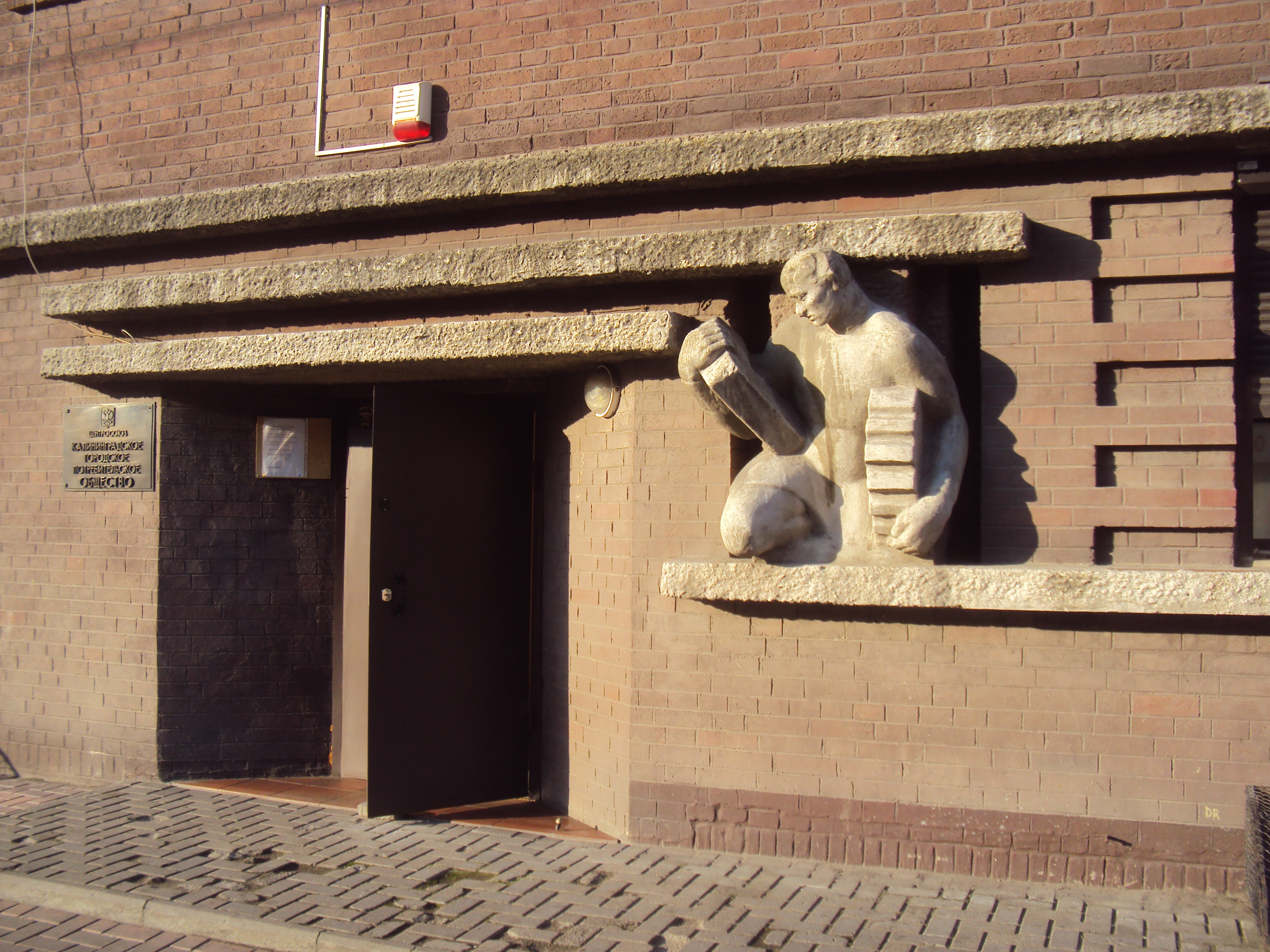
A relief on the wall of the Haus der Technik.

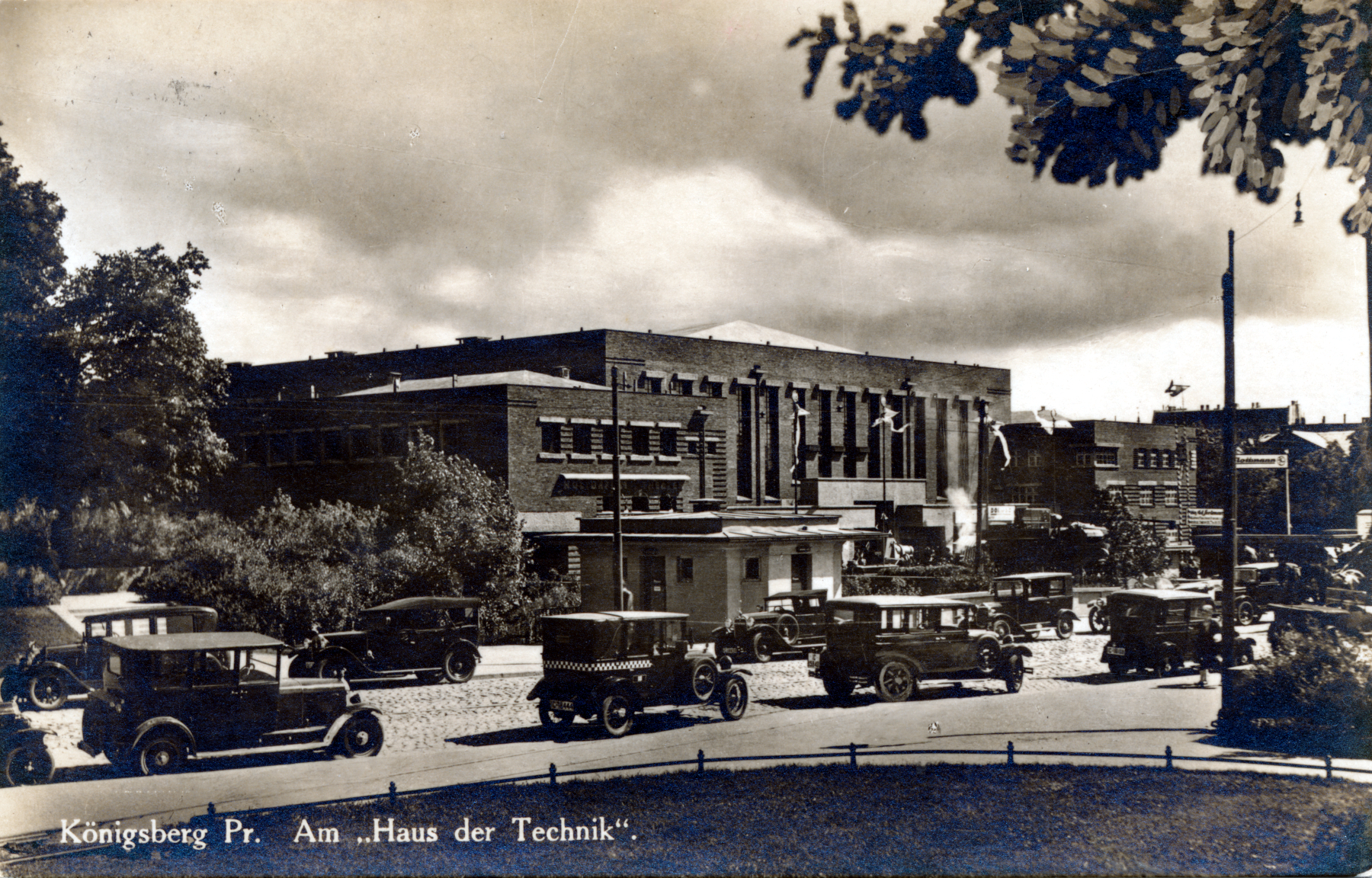
Haus der Technik c. 1925-1930.

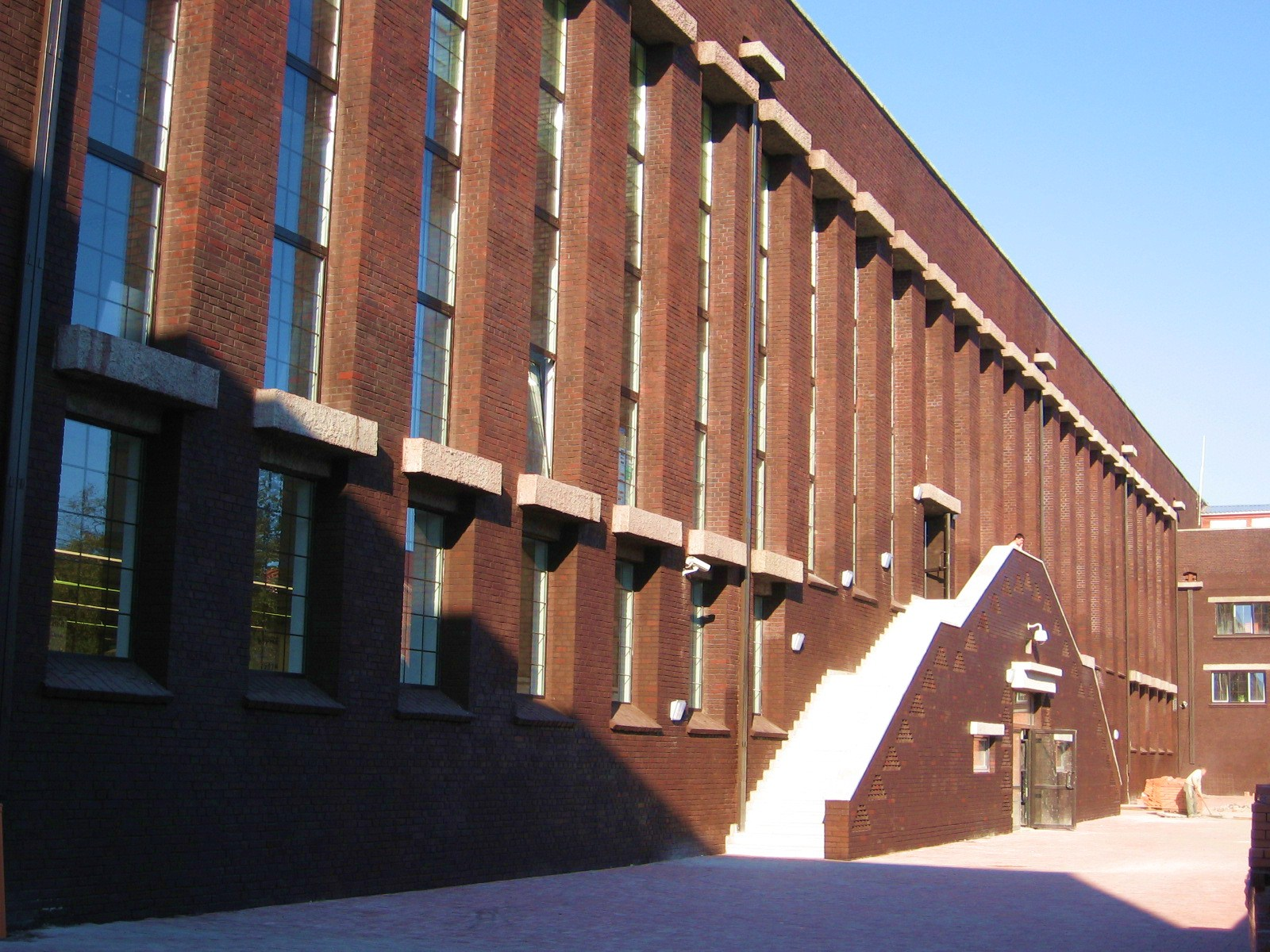
