= Herzog-Albrecht-Gedächtniskirche =

Church building in Maraunenhof, Soviet Union

Coordinates: 54°44′11″N 20°31′30″E

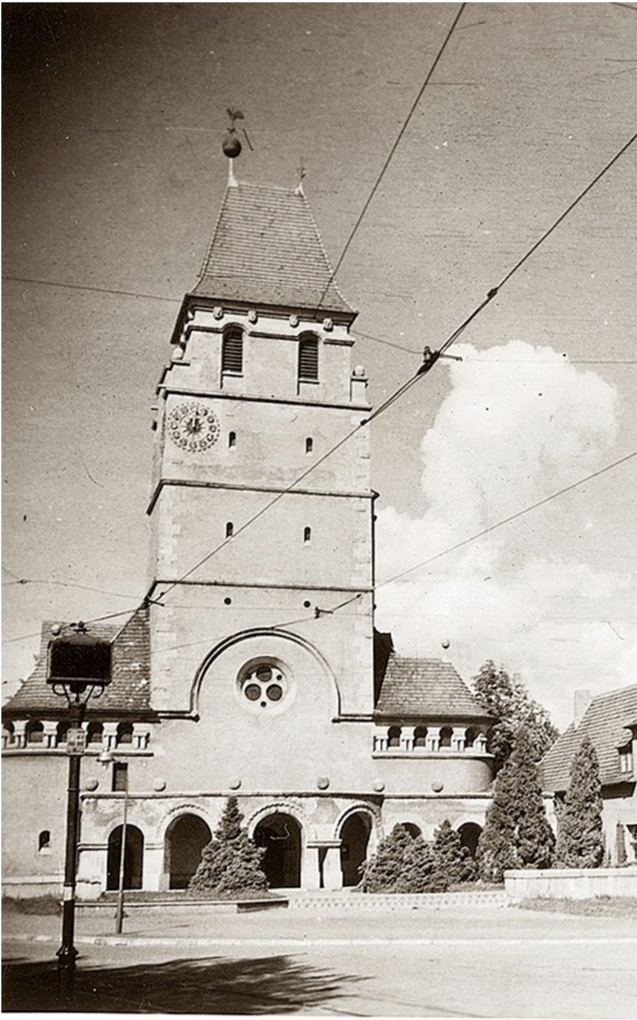

The Herzog-Albrecht-Gedächtniskirche (German for "Duke Albert Memorial Church") was a Protestant church in northern Königsberg, Germany. Its name honored Albert I, Duke of Prussia (1490–1568), an early supporter of Lutheranism.

By the early 20th century, the churches of Tragheim and Neurossgarten were too far away for the growing population of Königsberg's Maraunenhof quarter, so a new church was planned in 1908 at Maraunenhof's König-Ottokar-Platz. Construction of the Neo-Romanesque building, designed by the architects H. Mattar and E. Scheler, began on 19 May 1911, with its dedication as the New Tragheim Church (Neuer Tragheimer Kirche) occurring on 12 January 1913. It became known as the Maraunenhof Church (Maraunenhofer Kirche) in 1928 when the parish became independent from Tragheim. It was also sometimes known as the König-Ottokar-Kirche, after King Ottokar II of Bohemia, namesake of the city and nearby square.

In 1933, during celebrations of the 450th anniversary of the birth of Martin Luther, the church was renamed the Herzog-Albrecht-Gedächtniskirche zu Königsberg-Maraunenhof. The interior of the church held life-size bronze figures of Saints John and Paul. The wooden crucifix was created by Georg Grasegger.

The memorial church was heavily damaged during the 1945 Battle of Königsberg. The Soviet administration in Kaliningrad demolished its remnants in 1972. The rectory was maintained, however, and was used first as a movie theatre and now as a children's music school named after E. T. A. Hoffmann.
