= Tragheim =

Coordinates: 54°42′58″N 20°30′44″E

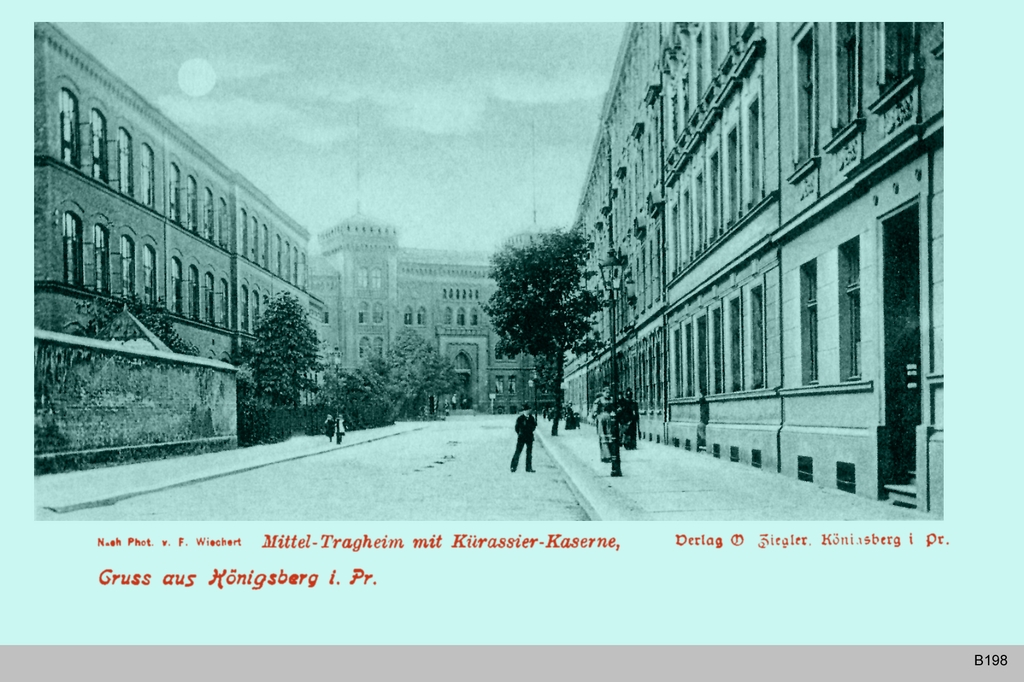
Mitteltragheim street in Tragheim, 3rd Cuirassier "Count Wrangel" regiment barracks visible at the end of the street.

Tragheim was a quarter of northern Königsberg, Germany. Its territory is now part of Kaliningrad, Russia.

== History ==
Tragheim was first documented in 1299, but probably already existed as an Old Prussian farming village in 1255 when the Teutonic Knights conquered Sambia during the Prussian Crusade. The German name Tragheim was derived from the Prussian Trakkeim, meaning a village in a forest clearing (similar to Trakehnen). Germans were a minority in the village along the Schlossteich and the Oberteich during the Middle Ages; by 1535 Prussian Lithuanians were also documented in Tragheim.

Tragheim became a Freiheit suburb under the control of Königsberg Castle, receiving its own court in 1528 and its own seal in 1577. Its coat of arms depicted a brown deer's head between two green fir trees on a blue field.

While Tragheim had been excluded from medieval Königsberg's walls, the village was included within the greater Baroque fortifications constructed during the 1620s. Neighboring quarters were the Lustgarten and Burgfreiheit to the south, Steindamm to the west, the city walls to the north, the Oberteich to the northeast, and the Schlossteich to the east. Farther to the north beyond the walls was the village of Tragheimsdorf and the heath known as the Tragheimer Palve.

Altstadt, Löbenicht, Kneiphof, and their respective suburbs were merged to form the united city of Königsberg in 1724. However, Königsberg Castle and its suburbs, including Tragheim, were included within the new city limits but remained under royal, not municipal, control. Tragheim was merged into the city during the Städteordnung of Stein on 19 November 1808 during the era of Prussian reforms.

By 1890 the area from Neurossgarten's Wagnerstraße through Steindamm to Tragheimer Pulverstraße was the most densely settled part of the city. During the late 19th and early 20th centuries, however, many of Königsberg's affluent citizens moved from Tragheim to the new suburbs of Amalienau and Maraunenhof. In the same era, Tragheim also had Königsberg's lowest birth rate. Tragheim Gate in the city walls was dismantled in 1911 to increase traffic and development in northern Königsberg. Tragheim was heavily damaged by the 1944 Bombing of Königsberg and 1945 Battle of Königsberg.

== Locations ==
As Tragheim grew, it was divided into western Vordertragheim ("nearer Tragheim"), central Mitteltragheim("middle Tragheim"), and eastern Hintertragheim ("further Tragheim").

The main thoroughfare in Vordertragheim was Tragheimer Kirchenstraße, which was named after the Lutheran Tragheim Church. The street ran from Junkerstraße to Wrangelstraße, parallel to Steindamm.

Mitteltragheim's main road, also called Mitteltragheim, ran from Burgstraße to Wallring. In 1897 the Baugewerkschule (building trades school) moved from Synagogenstraßse in Vorstadt to Schönstraße in central Tragheim. From 1860 to 1872 theater director Arthur Woltersdorff's Wilhelmstheater was located in Mitteltragheim. Acquired by the government in 1872, it was converted into the Regierungs-Präsidium, the administrative seat for Regierungsbezirk Königsberg, in 1880. By 1914 the Ostpreußische Zeitung, a conservative newspaper, was published from Tragheimer Pulverstraße in central Tragheim.

Hintertragheim's eponymous main road ran from Theaterplatz to Wrangelstraße. Hintertragheim with its sidestreets was nicknamed the Geheimratsviertel (privy council quarter) because of the many court officials who lived there. Numerous prominent professors also lived in Hintertragheim.

Königsberg's Masonic Lodges were located in Hintertragheim near the Schlossteich and included Zum Todtenkopfe und Phoenix(de), the Dreikronenloge, and the Johannisloge Immanuel. A mathematical physics cabinet was located in the private residence of Franz Ernst Neumann in Hintertragheim. A Baptist chapel was constructed in Hintertragheim in 1870, while the Wilhelmsgymnasium moved from Altroßgärter Predigerstraße in Rossgarten to Hintertragheim in 1879.

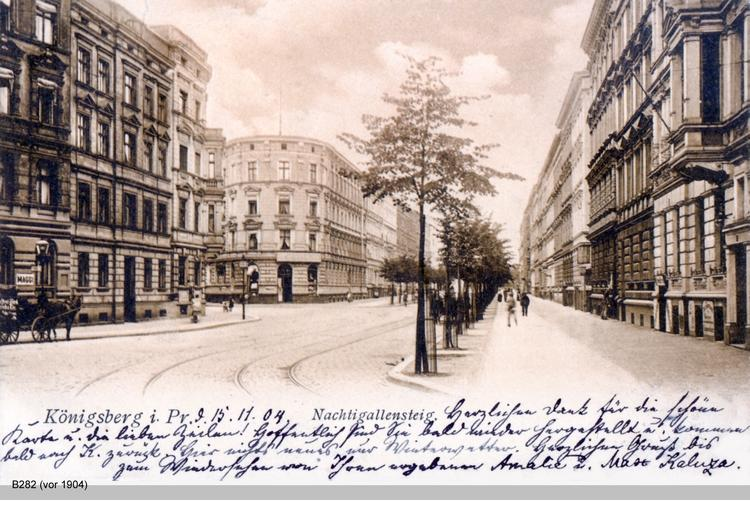
Nachtigallensteig street.

The street Nachtigallensteig(de) in northern Hintertragheim was named after the large numbers of nightingales which lived in the vicinity and frequented the Studentenfließ, a stream which flowed into the Oberteich. In 1698 Elector Frederick III imposed a fine of 100 Gulden for shooting or caging a nightingale. While the street was long known as Nachtigallensteig, the idyllic name was only made official in 1884.

The University of Königsberg moved from its original campus in Kneiphof to Paradeplatz between Tragheim and Burgfreiheit in 1861. Several of the university's buildings were also located in Tragheim. The royal and university library moved to the Braxein-Tettau-Henschesches Palais in 1901. A physics institute and an agriculture academy were located in northwestern Tragheim. The Baugewerkschule was situated on Schönstraße.

By the late 19th century, Wrangel-Straße in northern Tragheim contained the Protestant cemetery of Tragheim Church, a Jewish cemetery, the cuirassier barracks, and horse stables. The Bismarck-Oberlyzeum moved into the former barracks in 1931. Built in the early 20th century on the northern side of Wallring was the Haus der Technik, the Christuskirche, and the Kunsthalle, while the Hindenburg-Oberrealschule was on the southern side. The Ostmesse trade fair was located just north of Tragheim.

In 1906 military engineers dismantled part of the city walls in northern Tragheim just south of the Wrangel Tower (Wrangelturm, named after Friedrich Graf von Wrangel) near the Oberteich. In order to comply with Jewish law, the city's Adass Isroel congregation requested the installation of an eruv to enclose the community. A wire known as the Judendraht was thus installed over the gap in the wall, symbolically completing the eruv.

== Gallery ==
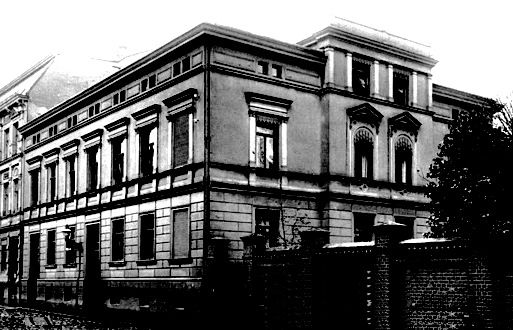
Kirchenstraße in Tragheim.

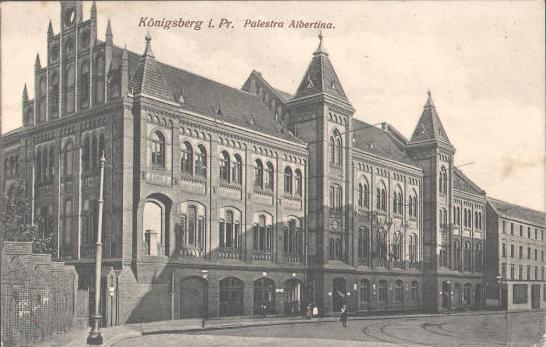
Palaestra Albertina(de) on Fließstraße.

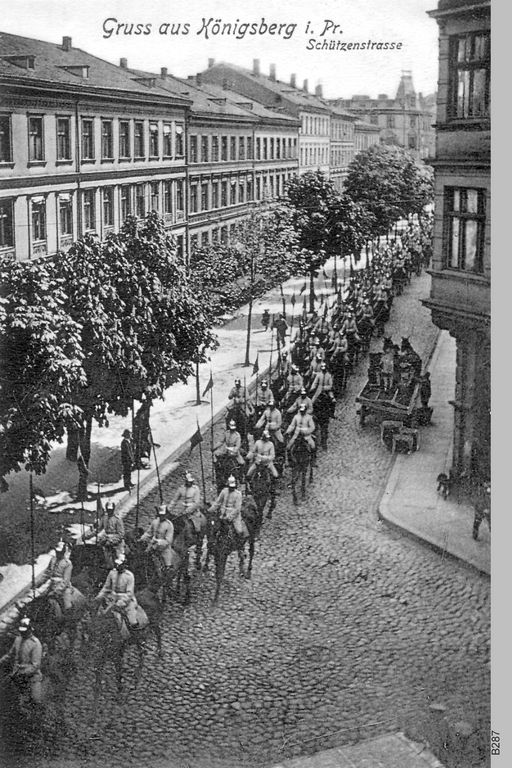
3rd Cuirassiers regiments parade on Schützenstrasse in Tragheim.

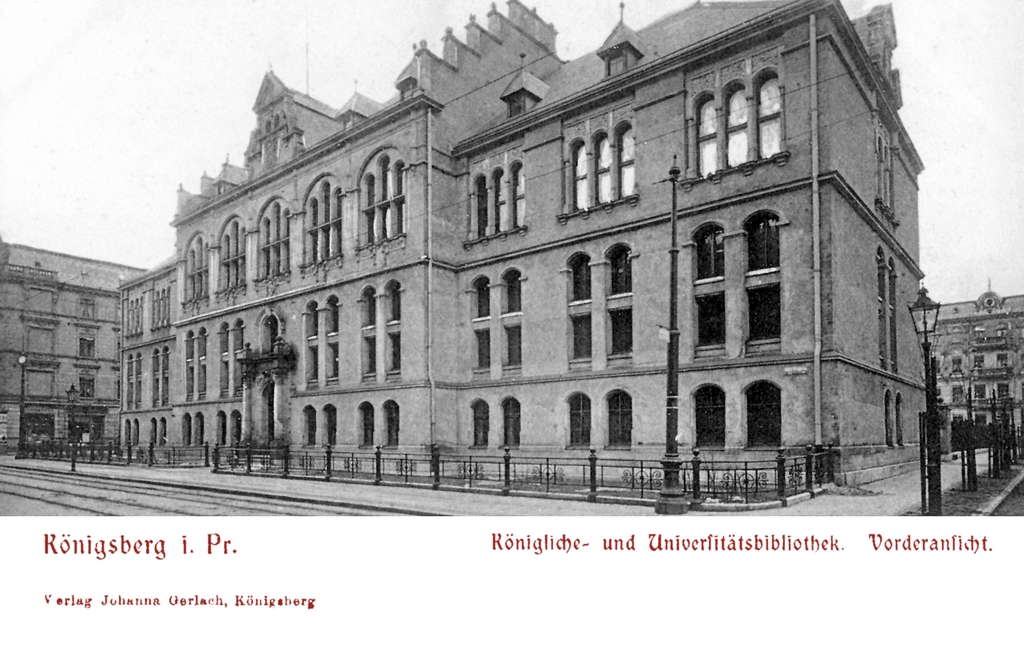
Royal University and Library in Mitteltragheim.

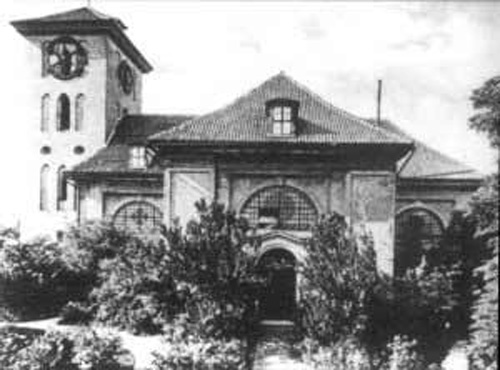
Tragheim church.

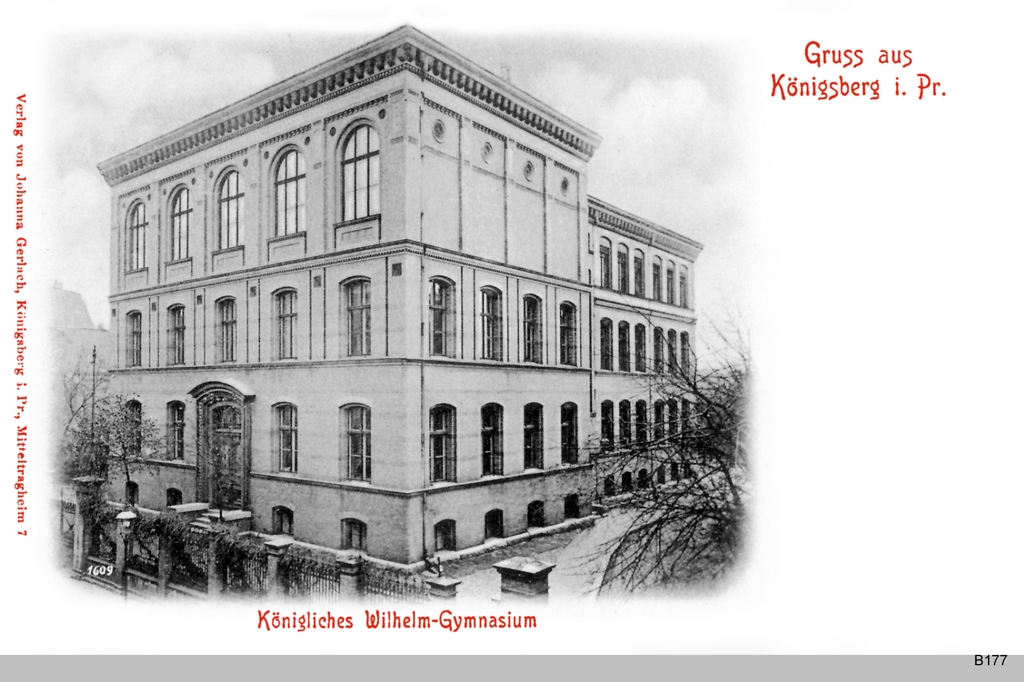
Wilhelmsgymnasium in Hintertragheim.

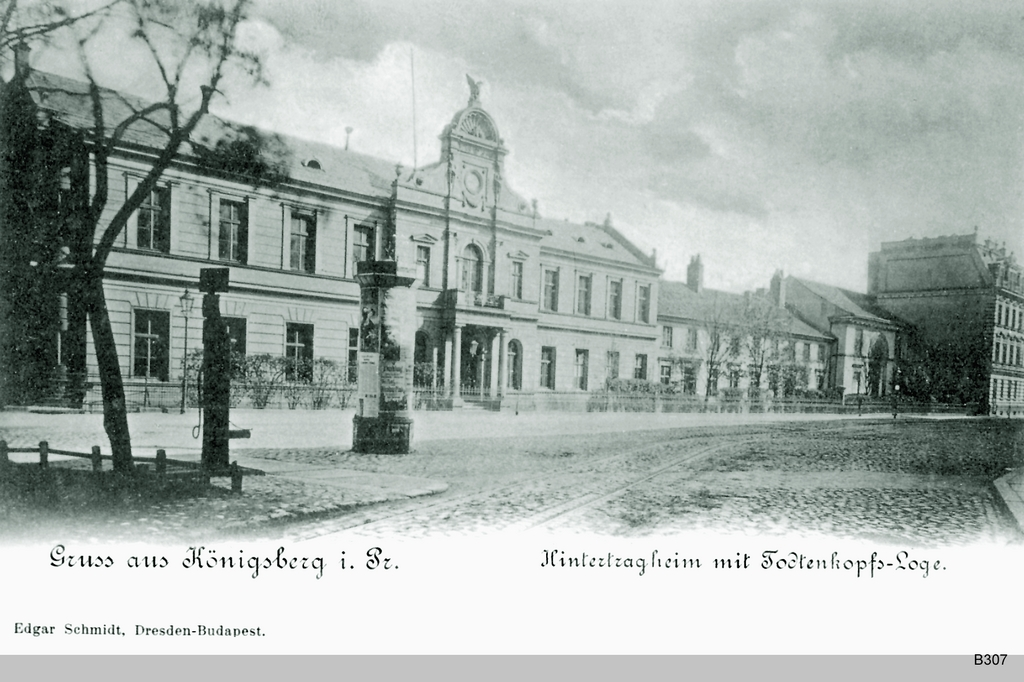
Zum Todtenkopfe und Phoenix masonic lodge in Hintertragheim.

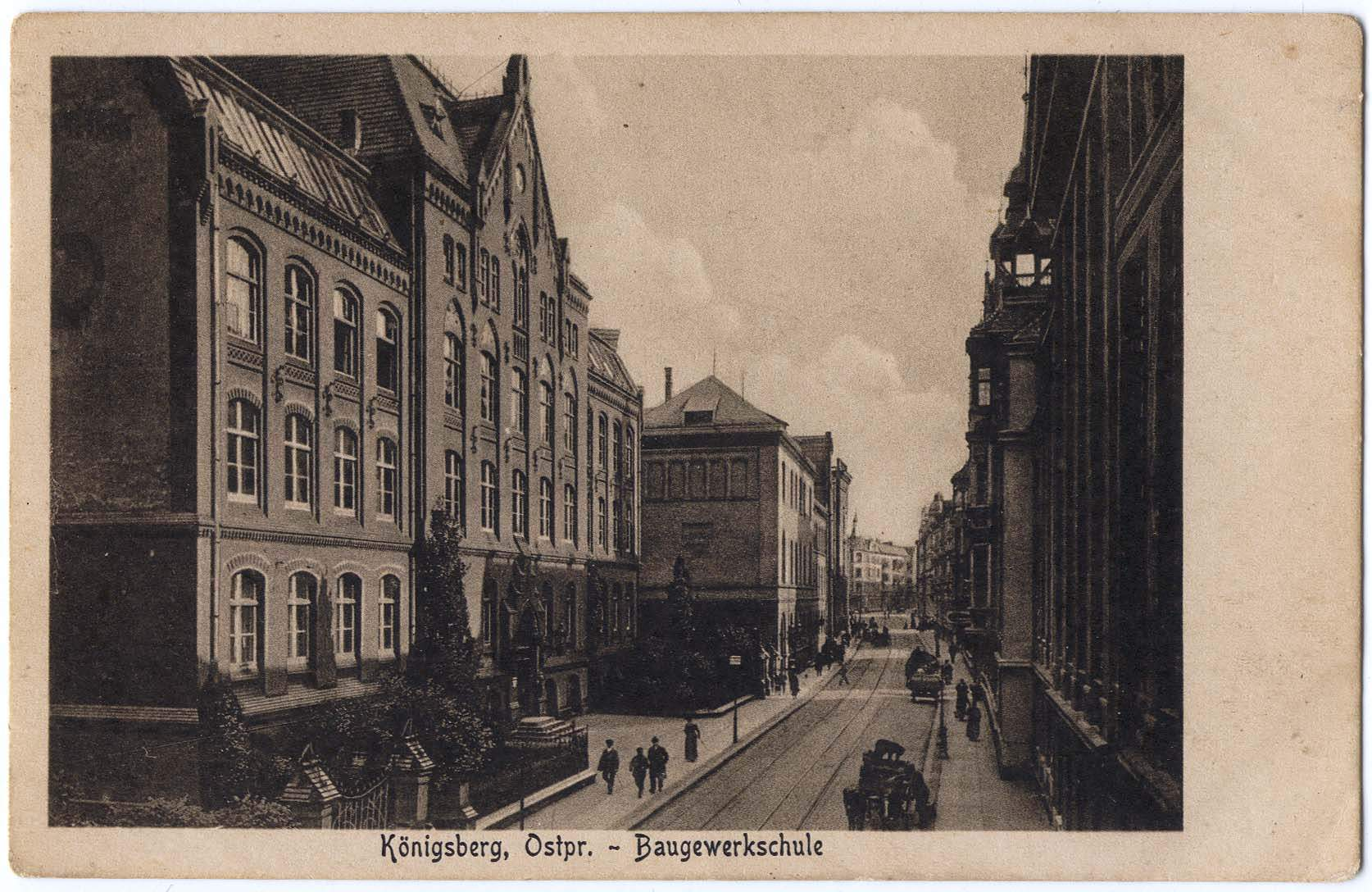
Baugewerkschule on Schönstraße, in Mitteltragheim.
