= Bismarck-Oberlyzeum =

- Königsberg; Germany

Information
- Type: Gymnasium
- Opened: 1931
- Closed: 1945

The Bismarck-Oberlyzeum was a girls' gymnasium in Königsberg, Germany. It was named after statesman Otto von Bismarck.

== History ==
The Frankenbergsches Lyzeum on Prinzenstraße in Sackheim was led by Hermine Lewitz and Helene von Frankenberg. When the Rauschningsche Schule was converted into a Mittelschule in 1925, its lyzeum classes were transferred to the Frankenbergsches Lyzeum, which was acquired by the city of Königsberg in 1925. It was renamed the Bismark-Lyzeum in 1930.

In 1931 the school was renamed the Bismarck-Oberlyzeum and acquired the closed Arnheim-Lyzeum of Tragheimer Pulverstraße in Tragheim. In the same year it moved to the modernized western wing of the decommissioned Wrangel-Kaserne (barracks) on Wrangelstraße in northern Tragheim. The barracks' eastern wing contained the Herderschule, a Volksschule.

The Oberlyzeum's directors were Anna Brenneisen and Franz Rutau, while its students included Tamara Ehlert. The school was not rebuilt in Kaliningrad after World War II.
