= Rossgarten =

Former district of Königsberg, Germany

Coordinates: 54.7200°N 20.5220°E

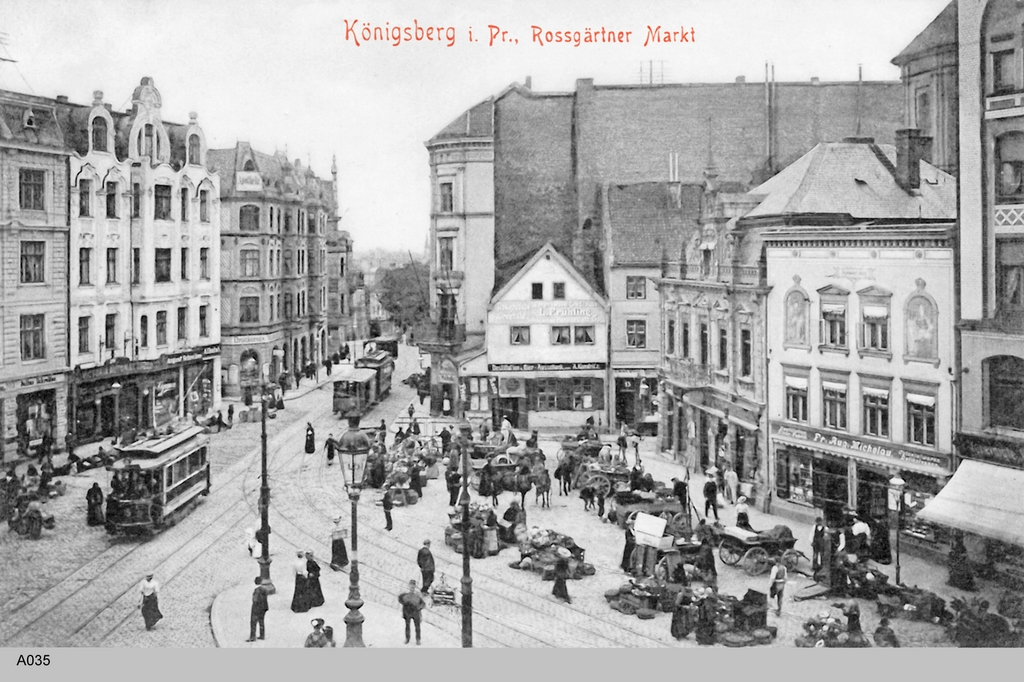
Rossgarten's marketplace, the Roßgärter Markt

Rossgarten (German: Roßgarten) was a quarter of northeastern Königsberg, Germany. It was also occasionally known as Altrossgarten (Altroßgarten) to differentiate it from Neurossgarten in northwestern Königsberg. Its territory is now part of the Leningradsky District of Kaliningrad, Russia.

== History ==
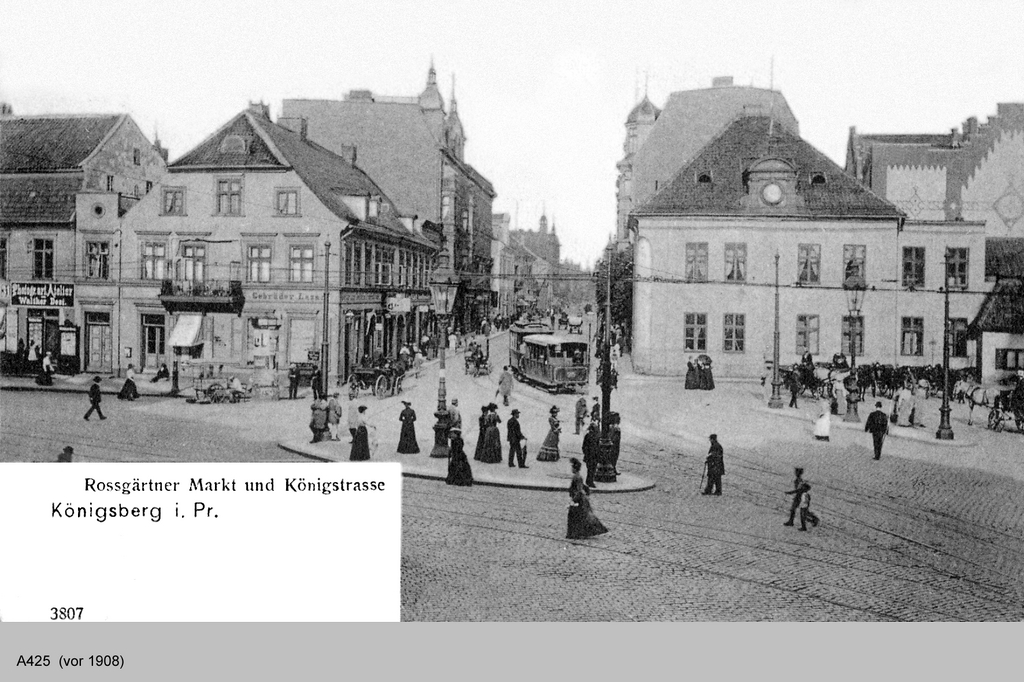
Roßgärter Markt and Königstraße

Rossgarten was first mentioned as the Roß- und Rindergarten (horse and cattle pasture) in the 1300 town charter of Löbenicht. It grew to encompass the eastern shore of the Schlossteich and reached the southern shore of the Oberteich. Neighboring districts were Burgfreiheit to the southwest, Neue Sorge to the south, the Herzogsacker fields to the east, and the 17th century Königsberg fortifications to the north. Located outside of the walls was Kalthof to the east and the Pferderennbahn, or horse racing track, in Carolinenhof to the northeast.

According to observations by Caspar Hennenberger, in 1539 the territory was still undeveloped, with an inn and warehouses the only buildings of note. In 1540 Albert I, Duke of Prussia, approved development of a new suburb known first as Neue Huben and then as Roßgarten. It was declared a Freiheit subordinate to Königsberg Castle in 1542. East Prussian noble families who lived in Rossgarten included the Buddenbrock, Gröben, Götzen, Kunheim, Ostau, Rauter, Schlieben, and Tettau. Many Dutch linen weavers settled in the new suburb by 1553. Latvian merchants also settled in Rossgarten.

As the quarter expanded, Rossgarten was divided into southern Vorder-Roßgarten ("nearer Rossgarten") and northern Hinter-Roßgarten ("further Rossgarten"). In 1576 Vorder-Roßgarten received its court seal depicting a grazing white horse in a green pasture from Duke Albert Frederick. Hinter-Roßgarten's seal, which depicted a black bull in a green meadow with a blue field, was granted in 1596 by Margrave George Frederick.

Altstadt, Löbenicht, Kneiphof, and their respective suburbs were merged to form the united city of Königsberg in 1724. However, Königsberg Castle and its suburbs, including Rossgarten, were included within the new city limits but remained under royal, not municipal, control. Rossgarten was merged into the city during the Städteordnung of Stein on 19 November 1808 during the era of Prussian reforms. Much of Rossgarten was destroyed by the 1944 bombing of Königsberg in World War II and the 1945 Battle of Königsberg.

== Locations ==
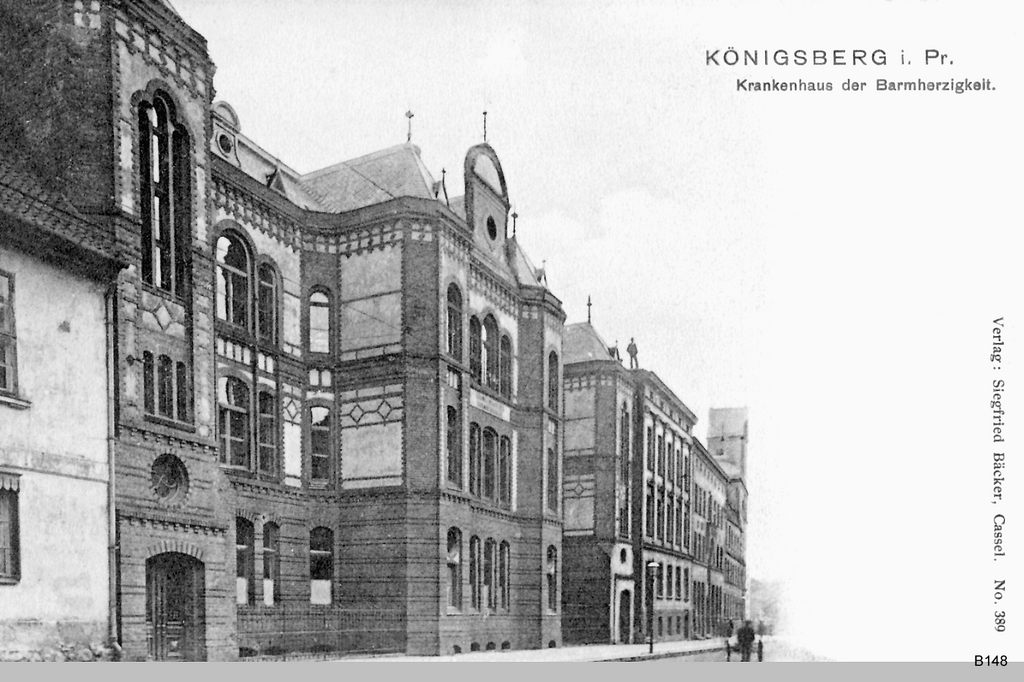
Krankenhaus der Barmherzigkeit

Rossgarten's main marketplace was Roßgärter Markt, located at the intersection of Vorder-Roßgarten and Königstraße near Burgfreiheit's Burgkirche. In the Middle Ages it was known as Vorm Heiligen Kreuz, named after a nearby monastery used as a casting house for the Teutonic Knights during the era of Frederick of Saxony. Vorder-Roßgarten's eponymous thoroughfare began at Roßgärter Markt and ran northeast until Strift-Straße, where it became Hinter-Roßgarten. The latter ended at Rossgarten Gate, part of the city walls.

The Städtische Krankenhaus was a hospital in western Hinter-Roßgarten which had 24 beds upon opening in 1797 and 120 beds by 1811. The Krankenhaus der Barmherzigkeit was another hospital created through the initiative of Lt. General Bernhard Joachim von Plehwe and two daughters of Commanding General Friedrich zu Dohna. In 1848 it opened in eastern Hinter-Roßgarten with three deaconesses from Kaiserswerth.

Reflecting the increasing influence of Königsberg's labor movement, the Gewerkschafthaus was inaugurated in Vorder-Roßgarten in May 1914. The spacious three-story building was designed by Waldemar Kuckuck and contained offices for political parties and trade unions. The hall contained a bust of the socialist leader Ferdinand Lassalle. Its coffeehouse, the Kaffeegarten, had a pleasant view over the Schlossteich. The city's social democratic newspaper, the Königsberger Volkszeitung, was published in the Gewerkschafthaus. The building was occupied by the Nazi Party during Gleichschaltung and renamed the Braunes-Haus.

The Generalkommando was located in Vorder-Roßgarten with a garden reaching the Schlossteich. It was originally the 18th-century Musenhof der Keyserlings, a palace owned by the counts of Keyserling, who were patrons of the arts. In 1809 it was acquired by King Frederick William III for use as the Kronprinzenpalais for the crown prince. It became a military headquarters in 1814 and then the official residence of the commanding general in 1830. Another military building was Hinter-Roßgarten's Kommandantur.

Herzogsacker, once part of Kalthof's fields, was known as Marschallsacker in 1695 when it was given to the Duke (Herzog) of Holstein-Beck and renamed in his honor. Herzogsacker contained the stadium of SV Concordia Königsberg, a parade ground, and numerous cemeteries.

The Stadthalle, now the Kaliningrad Regional Museum of History and Arts, was a performing arts center in Vorder-Roßgarten. It included concert halls (Körtesaal, Krohnesaal, and Gebauhrsaal), a restaurant, and a garden cafe by the Schlossteich.

== Gallery ==
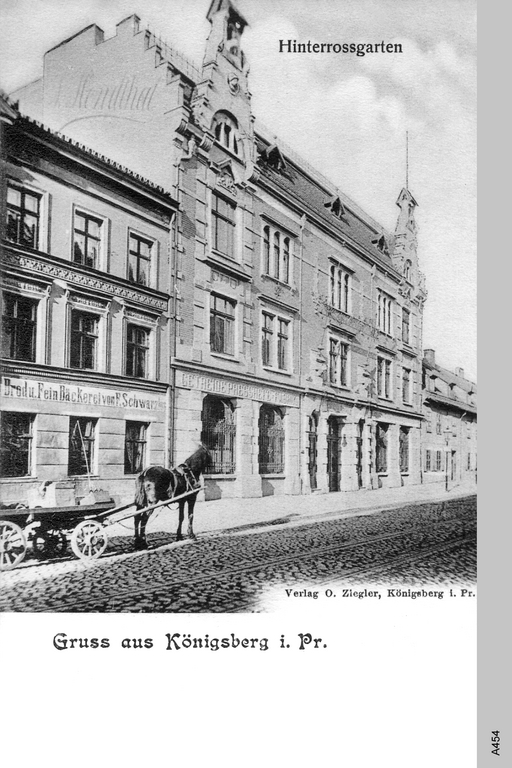
Hinter-Roßgarten

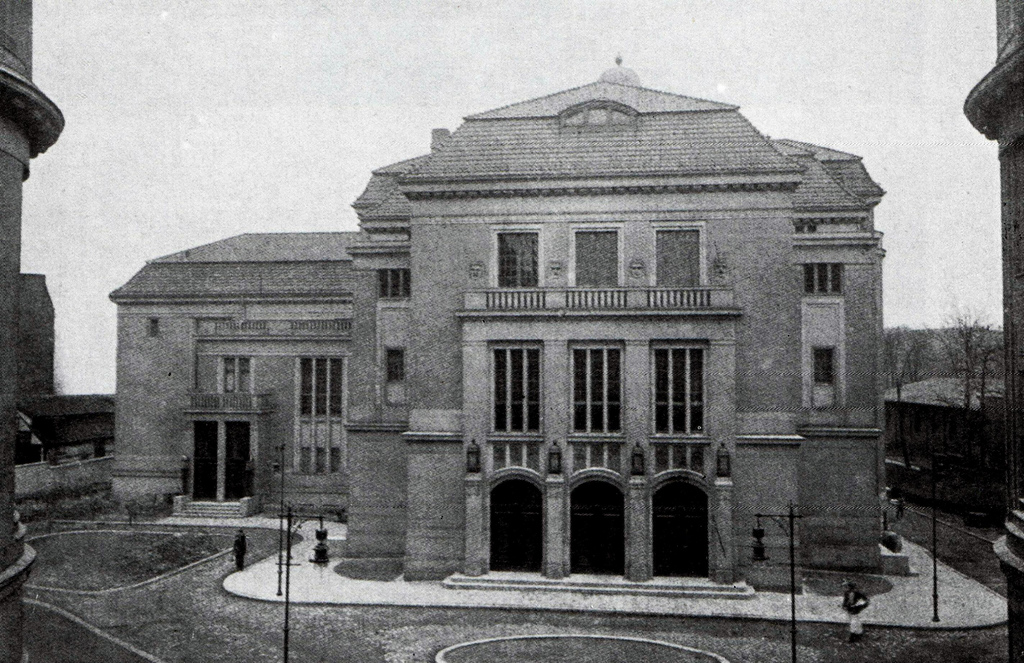
Stadthalle

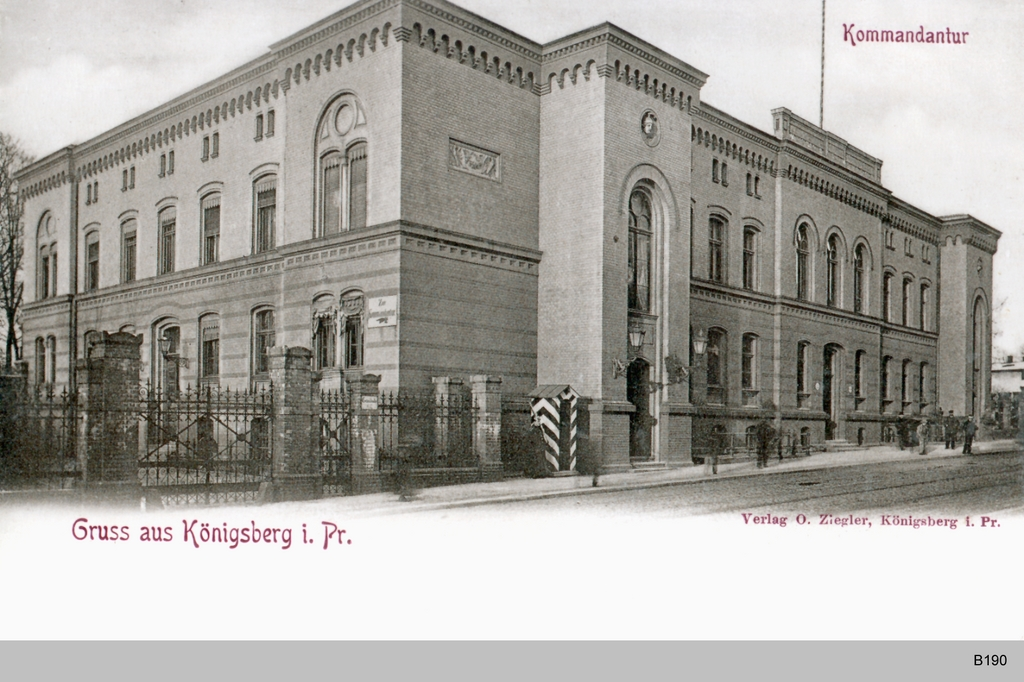
Kommandantur

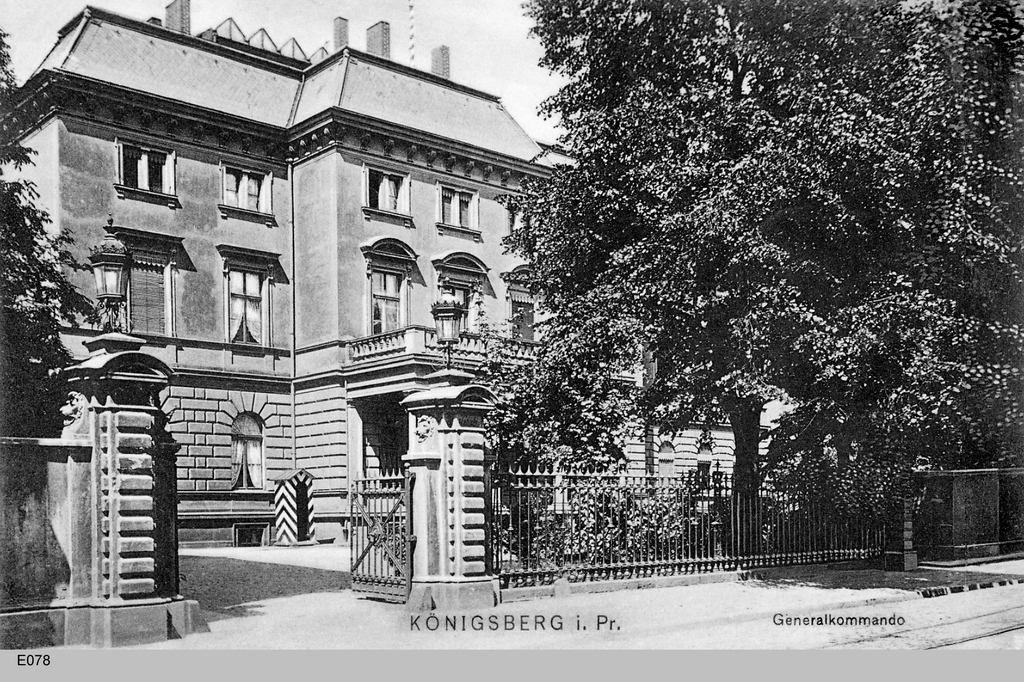
Generalkommando
