= Ostmesse =

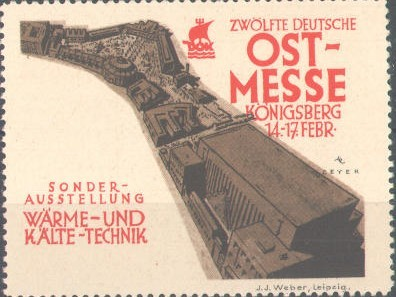
Postage stamp promoting the Ostmesse

The Ostmesse, officially the Deutsche Ostmesse Königsberg (DOK), was a trade fair in Königsberg, Germany. It was established to aid in the recovery of East Prussia after its separation from Weimar Germany following World War I.

== History ==
Lord Mayor Hans Lohmeyer came up with the idea for a trade fair in Königsberg to inspire optimism and improve the economy; similar post-war fairs were held in Breslau (Wrocław), Frankfurt, and Poznań. The first Ostmesse, opened by President Friedrich Ebert on 26 September 1920, was held in the Königsberg Zoo and encompassed 50,000 m^{2}.

The following year the Ostmesse moved to a new site designed by Hanns Hopp along Wallring and Hansaring, just north of Steindamm and Tragheim. This permanent site initially encompassed 60,000 m^{2} and was financed with 7.5 million Mark from the German government and 2.5 million from the Free State of Prussia. Seven halls covering 23,000 m^{2} were subsequently constructed. The Handelshof was built nearby from 1922 to 1923, but was infrequently used and instead became the new city hall. Beginning in 1925 technical demonstrations were held in the Haus der Technik. By the end of the 1920s the Ostmesse encompassed 80,000 m^{2}. Plans to expand westward in the vicinity of the Nordbahnhof station were halted by the outbreak of World War II.

The early fairs were provincial and largely agricultural in nature, but well received by East Prussians. A popular description of the fair was "Des ganzen Ostens Presse meist die Königsberger Messe preist" (the entire eastern press praised the Königsberg fair). The Spring 1922 fair included 1,650 firms, while the Fall 1923 fair featured 2,500 exhibitors. Besides the featured goods and technical exhibitions, later fairs included construction, cattle, fishing, hunting, and other special shows. The tenth fair was opened on 17 February 1925 by Chancellor Hans Luther.

Foreign participation increased as the fair grew and included Estonia, Finland, Hungary, Latvia, Poland, Sweden, Turkey, and especially the Soviet Union. Königsberg's Ostmesse and the Leipzig Trade Fair were recognized as the only official German trade fairs. The first Fair was held in September 1920 after which they were held in February and August, until 1928, when for economic reasons they began to be held annually instead, usually in late August. The Ostmesse had 1,873 firms and 65,000 visitors in 1930, 120,000 visitors in 1933, and 204,000 visitors in 1937. The fair was directed by Dr. Erich Wiegand until 1930, when he was succeeded by Consul Hans Jonas. The final fair was held in October 1941 during World War II.
