= Lower Pond (Kaliningrad) =

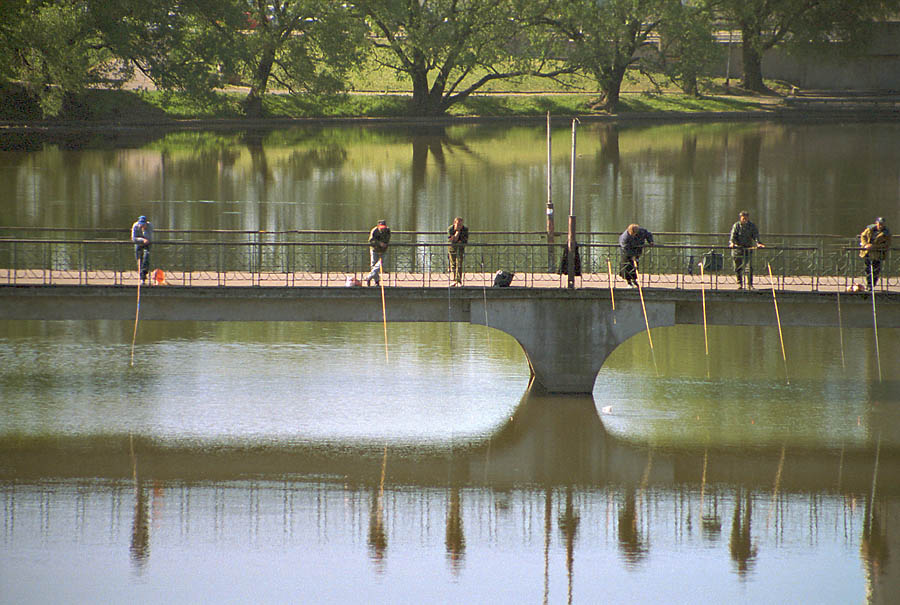
- Bridge over Lower Pond

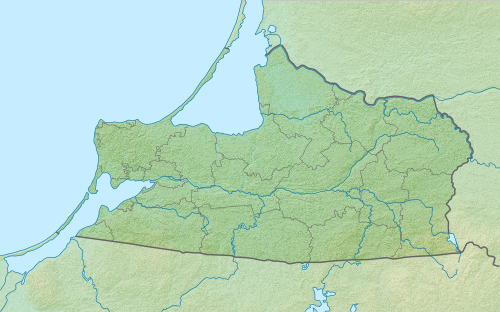
- Location within Kaliningrad Oblast
- Location: Kaliningrad, Kaliningrad Oblast
- Coordinates: 54°42′56″N 20°31′6″E
- Type: artificial lake
- Basin countries: Russia
- Max. length: 1 km (0.62 mi)
- Max. width: 100 m (330 ft)

The Lower Pond (Russian: Нижний пруд, until 1945 German: Schlossteich) is a large artificial pond in northern Kaliningrad, Russia.

The pond is about one kilometre long, north to south. Along its length, its width varies between about 50 and 100 metres. The source of the water is from the north. The water eventually drains underground down to the river Pregel to the south. During the winter months, the pond can freeze over.

== History ==
The pond, first documented by the Teutonic Knights in 1256, was created by damming the Katzbach stream which led to the Pregel. Mills constructed nearby caused the pond to be known as the Mühlenteich (mill pond). The Teutonic Knights' infirmary was constructed along the southwestern edge of the pond, while the Magdalenenkloster (Magdalene monastery) was built on the southern shore. A second pond, the Oberteich or Upper Pond, was created north of the first pond in 1270.

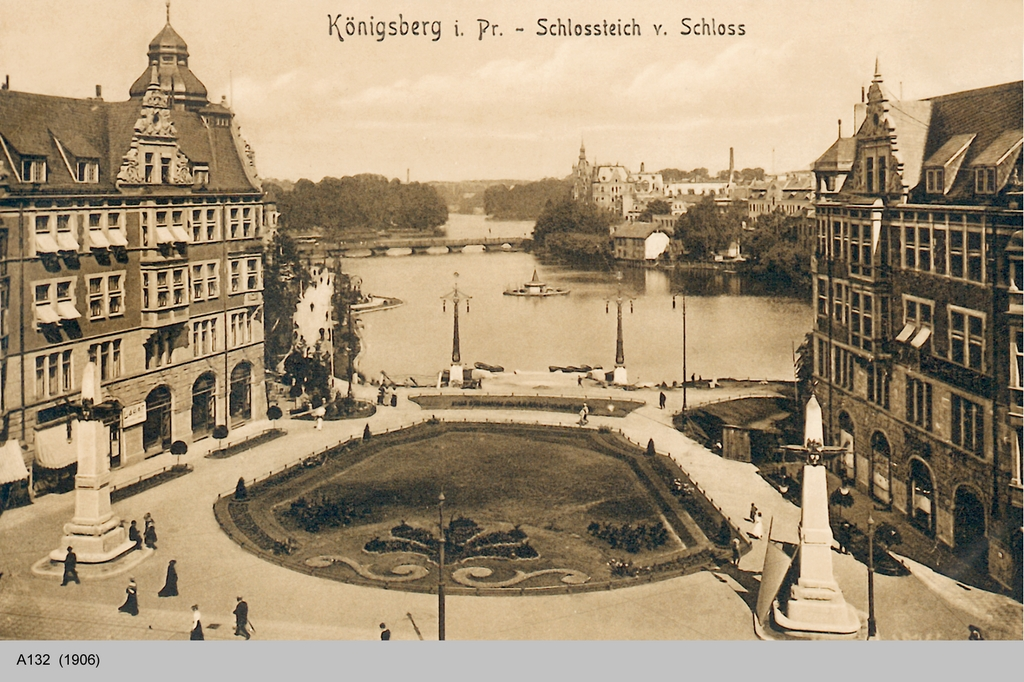
Schlossteich, with Münzplatz in the foreground, as seen from the Haberturm (the northeast tower of Königsberg Castle)

By the time of the Duchy of Prussia's creation in 1525, the pond was known as the Schlossteich, named after nearby Königsberg Castle (Schloss). The Schlossteich was surrounded by Burgfreiheit along the southern shore, Tragheim to the west, the Oberteich to the north, and Rossgarten to the east. Regent George Frederick, Margrave of Brandenburg-Ansbach, had a pair of swans relocated to the pond in 1604, but they were considered a nuisance by the burghers. A crossing between Tragheim and the Burgkirche was laid out in 1717, while the Schlossteichbrücke bridge was completed in 1753. During a visit to Königsberg by King William I in 1869, part of the bridge collapsed due to the multitude of people on it, with 32 drowning.

The residents of Königsberg gradually came to appreciate the beauty of the pond close to the Königsgarten, with many nobles building palaces near the waterfront. Holstein-Beck constructed his palace, later developed into the Kommandantur Königsberg, in 1693, while the merchant Hevelke built his summer house nearby in 1750. The palace of Count Gebhard Johann von Keyserling was later turned into the Generalkommando. Königsberg's Masonic Lodges were located in Hintertragheim near the Schlossteich and included Zum Todtenkopfe und Phoenix, the Dreikronenloge, and the Johannisloge Immanuel. King Frederick William III of Prussia granted the pond to the city in 1810.

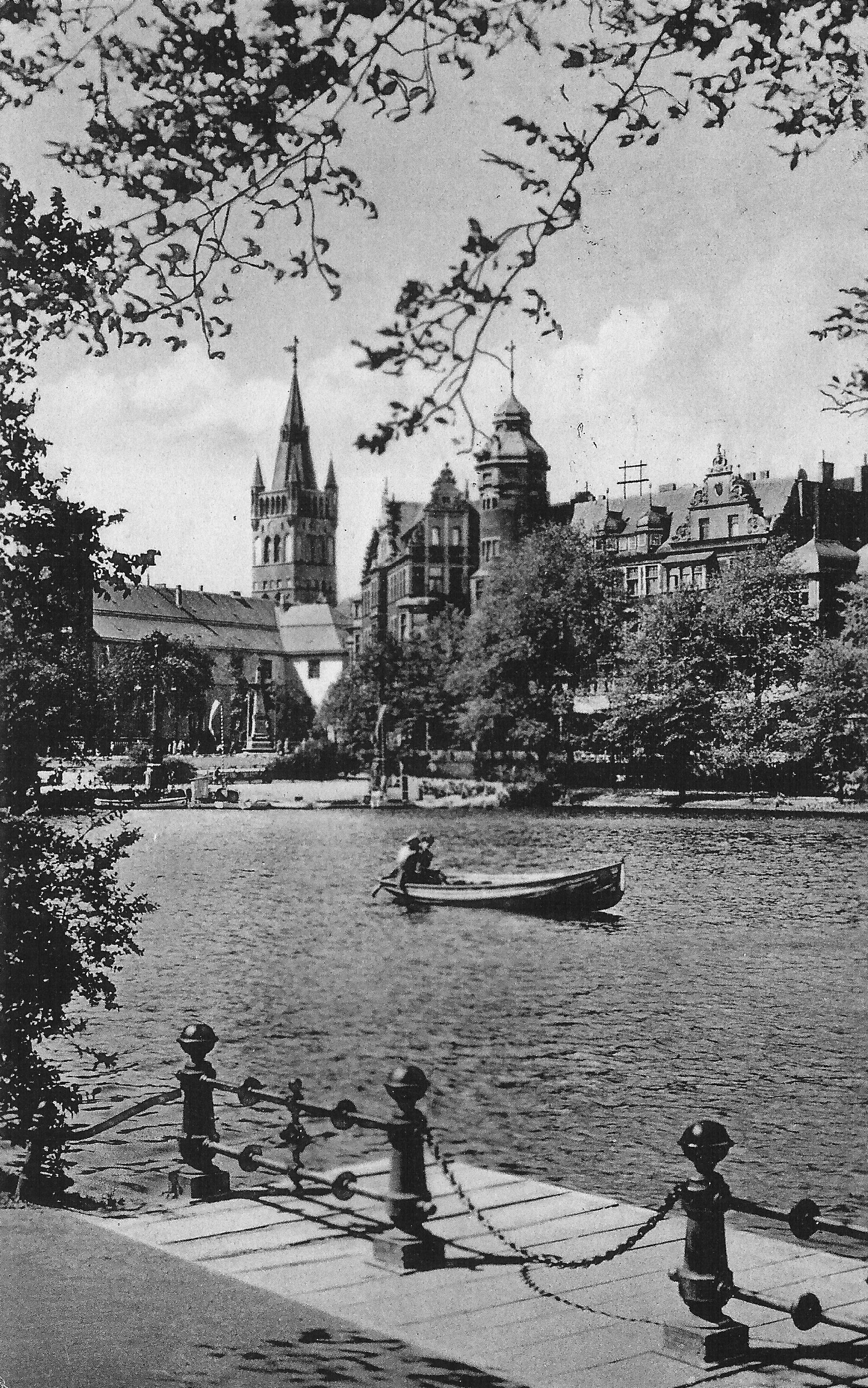
View over the Schlossteich toward Königsberg Castle

Numerous recreational establishments were built along the Schlossteich from 1830–70, including the Borckscher Garten, Jacobsruh, Tivoli, Jardin de Berlin, the Börsengarten, and the Bürgerressource. The 300th anniversary of the founding of the Albertina, the University of Königsberg, was celebrated along the Schlossteich in 1844. The swampy northern corner near Hinterroßgarten was filled in 1881. The Städtische Krankenhaus was a hospital built along the northeastern Schlossteich in 1895.

The scenic promenade was a favourite recreational area for the people of Königsberg, especially students. The promenade extended in the southwest from Münzplatz until the Schlossteichbrücke by 1906, while the southeastern stretch reached the Stadthalle in 1911. The northeastern extension of the Promenade with cascading waterfalls was finished by 1930, while the northwestern stretch was completed in 1937 after the expropriation of the Masonic Lodges.

The Schlossteich was surrounded by cafés and was central to many important buildings and places, including Königsberg Castle to the southwest, the new campus of the Albertina to the west, and Münzplatz at the southern end of the pond. Concerts were performed at the Börsengarten and the Stadthalle. Along the western side of the Schlossteich was a statue called Der Bogenschütze or Der Bogenspanner (The Archer) by Heinemann, while along the eastern side were the Burgkirche and the Bellevue hotel and restaurant. Gondolas were frequently used in the pond, and on Walpurgis Night members of the German Student Corps would travel in paper lantern-decorated boats. During winter the Schlossteich was used for ice skating. In 1919 the pond contained 22 white swans and two black swans.

The pond was transferred from Germany to the Soviet Union following World War II in 1945. Most of the surrounding German-era construction was destroyed during the 1944 Bombing of Königsberg and 1945 Battle of Königsberg.

== Gallery ==
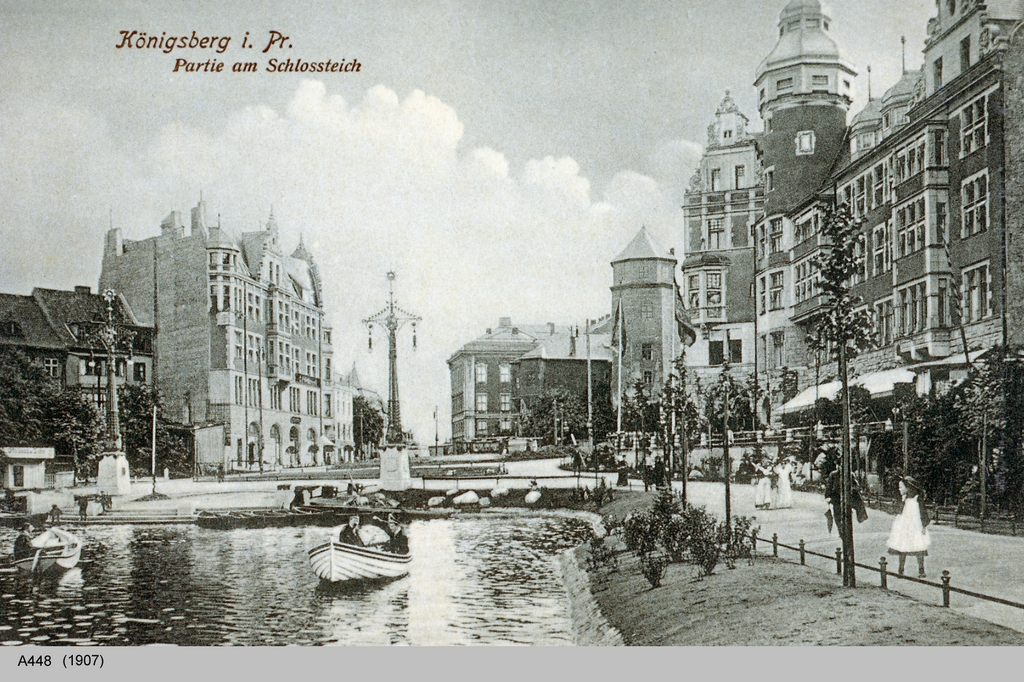
Southwest corner of the Schlossteich, with Münzplatz behind

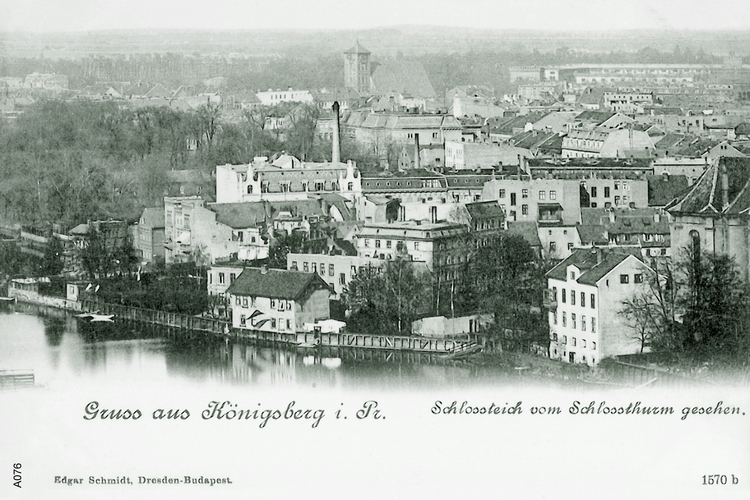
View from Königsberg Castle over the pond toward Altrossgarten Church

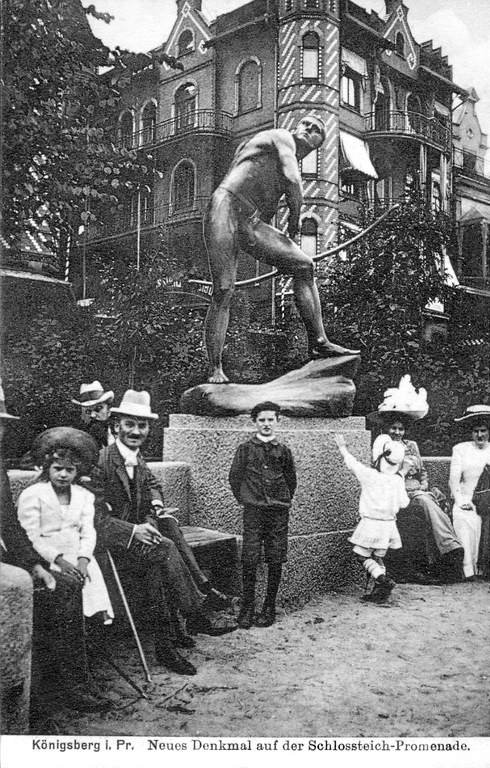
Der Bogenschütze statue
