= Hindenburg-Oberrealschule =

- Königsberg; Germany

Information
- Former name: Städtische Steindammer Mittelschule
- Type: Oberrealschule
- Established: October 1868

The Hindenburg-Oberrealschule or Hindenburgschule was an Oberrealschule in Königsberg, Germany.

== History ==
The school began as the Städtische Steindammer Mittelschule, a municipal Mittelschule in the Steindamm quarter. It opened with 27 students in three classes in October 1868 and grew quickly under headmaster Carl A. Kißner. It moved to a stately building on 1. Fließstraße in 1890 and was renamed the Steindammer Realschule in 1902.

In January 1917 the growing school moved to a new building constructed on Wallring in northern Tragheim from 1914 to 1917. At the same time it was dedicated as the Hindenburg-Realschule, in honor of Paul von Hindenburg. Professor Otto Portzehl led its elevation to the Hindenburg-Oberrealschule during Easter 1918. By 1920 it was the largest school in Königsberg, with 780 students. The building now houses part of the Kaliningrad State Technical University in Kaliningrad, Russia.
