= Kaliningrad State Technical University =

Technical university in Kaliningrad, Russia

Coordinates: 54°43′15″N 20°29′54″E

- Калининградский государственный технический университет
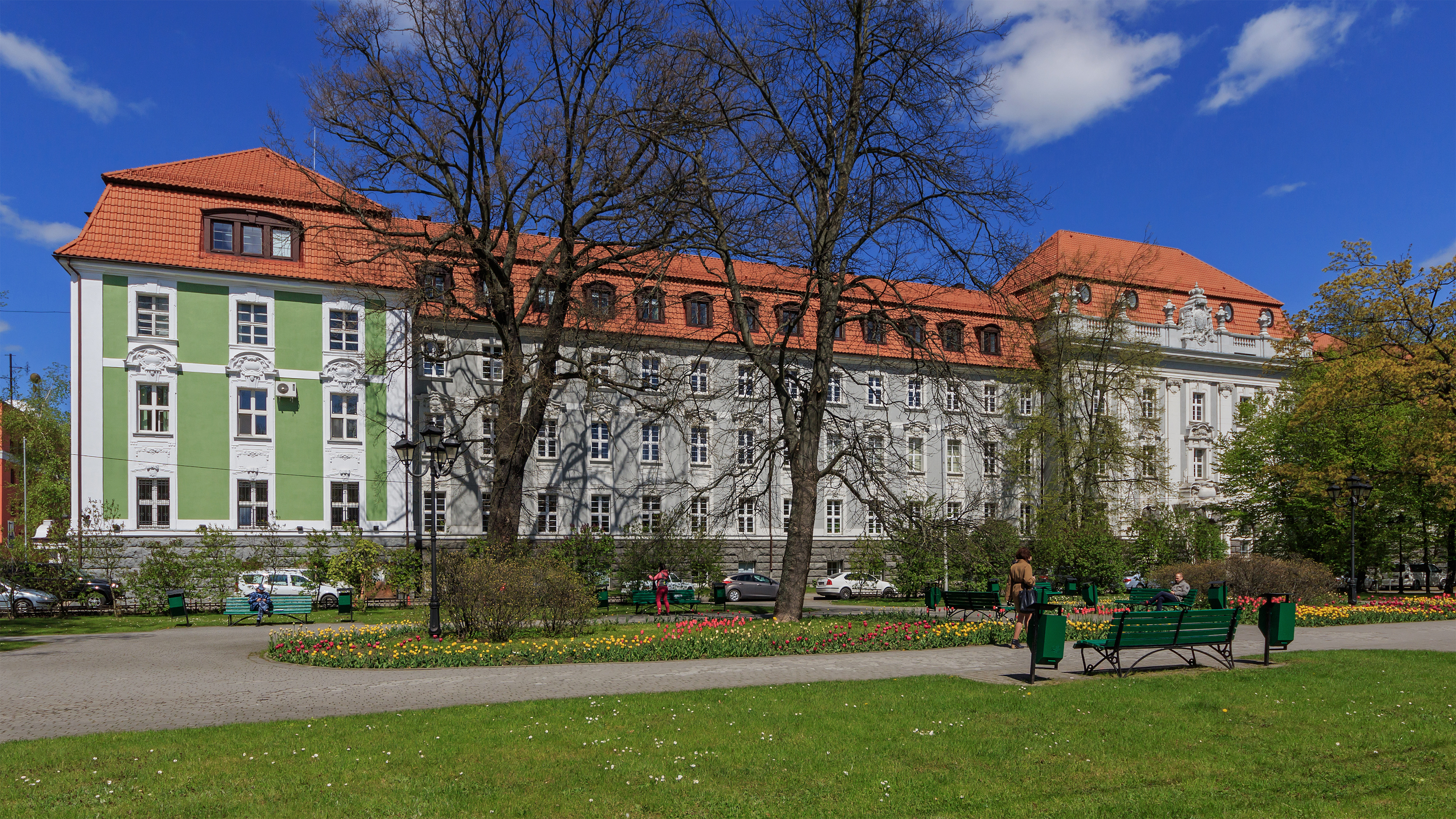
- Type: University
- Established: 1930
- Rector: Volkogon Vladimir Alekseevich
- Undergraduates: 6700
- Location: Kaliningrad, Russia
- Website: https://klgtu.ru/en/

University rankings

Regional – Overall
- QS Emerging Europe and Central Asia: 401-450 (2022)

Kaliningrad State Technical University (Russian: Калининградский государственный технический университет, (КГТУ); abbreviated KSTU) is a technical university at Victory Square in Kaliningrad, Russia. It is located in the former combined Amtsgericht and Landgericht building which served as judicial courts during the German period of the city. It is the largest higher educational institution in the fishing industry of Russia.

Having been founded on the basis of Moscow Technical Institute for the Fishery Industry, KSTU develops as a multi-disciplinary institution considering the demands and the economic potential of the Region. Students are trained in 42 higher educational courses at various levels, namely, Bachelor, Specialist Diploma, Master, Candidate of Sciences and Doctor of Sciences Degrees; professionals are offered various upgrading courses. 600 teachers and researchers, including 75 professors holding the Doctor of Sciences Degree, 80 academicians and corresponding members of international and public Russian Academies of Science form the faculty if the university. Scientific research is traditionally undertaken in many areas. There are 12 research laboratories and scientific centres, four of them being of the applied character. Four dissertation councils work at the university.

Recently, intensification of scientific work has involved the university into 25 federal scientific programmes, as well as in TEMPUS and TACIS projects. Regional representatives of public professional Academies of Science applied Centre for new Information Technologies, Research Institute for Maritime Engineering Service, Institute of Ecology and Sustainable Development successfully operate on the university basis.

International co-operation of the university with foreign educational and research organizations is constantly expanding, with the Baltic Sea region in particular.

== Research ==
Research at the university is undertaken in applied subjects, including: Water Bioresources and Aquaculture, Fisheries, Automation and Machine Building, Biochemistry, Biology, Ecology, Power Engineering, Shipbuilding, Computer Technologies, Economics and Management, Fish and Food Processing Technology, Linguistics, Mathematics, Physics. Most of the university's research is focused in biological resources of the world's oceans, the Baltic Sea area and inland waters, aquaculture, new technologies for fish processing and food production, development of information science, computer applications and technologies, research into the rational use of traditional and non-traditional power resources, problems of shipbuilding, civil engineering and architecture, ecology, life safety, laser technology, and micro- and nanotechnology.

== Faculties ==
1. Faculty of Bioresources and Naturals Usage
2. Commercial Fisheries Faculty
3. Mechanics and Technology Faculty
4. Naval and Power Engineering Faculty
5. Automatic Production and Control Faculty
6. Economics Faculty
7. Humanities Faculty
8. Fundamental Training Faculty
9. Upgrading Faculty
10. Fundamental Training Division for Foreign Students

== Museums ==
The university has a museum of history and art with a number of exhibits. Some of them date back to the beginning of the 20th century. There are also two unique specialized museums: the Ichthyology Museum and the Hydrobiology one. The exhibits of these present the fauna of the World Ocean
