= Upper Pond (Kaliningrad) =

- Oberteich
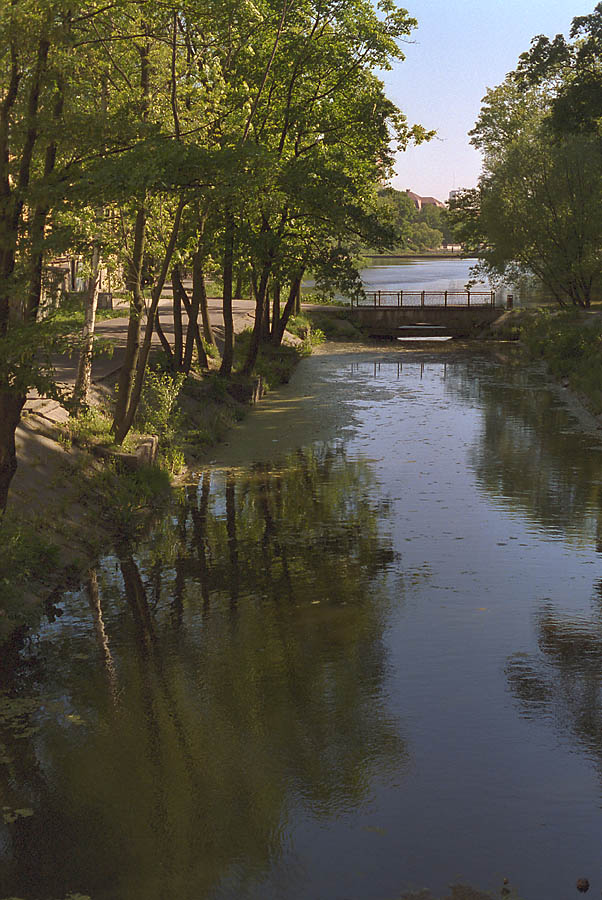
- Bridge over Upper Pond

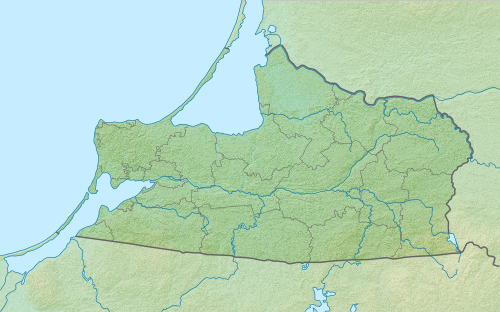
- Location within Kaliningrad Oblast
- Location: Kaliningrad, Kaliningrad Oblast
- Coordinates: 54°43′26″N 20°31′09″E
- Type: artificial lake
- Basin countries: Russia
- Surface area: 41.1 ha (102 acres)

The Upper Pond (Russian: Верхний пруд) is a large artificial pond in northern Kaliningrad, Russia. It was known as the Oberteich while part of Königsberg, Germany, until 1945.

The pond is elevated 22 metres above the Pregel River and encompasses 41.1 hectares. Freshwater life living in the Upper Pond include perch, roach, carp, tench, pike, and eels. Located near the water is the Kaliningrad Amber Museum.

== History ==
The Upper Pond, then known as the Oberteich, was created in 1270 by the Teutonic Knights as a fishing pond north of medieval Königsberg. The levee separating it from the southern Schlossteich or Lower Pond eventually became the street Wrangelstraße. Part of the rural district of Königsberg (Landkreis Königsberg i. Pr.) since 1818, the Oberteich was incorporated into the city limits on 1 April 1882.

Quarters of Königsberg in the vicinity of the pond included Hinterroßgarten to the southeast, Hintertragheim to the southwest, Tragheimsdorf to the west, and Maraunenhof to the north. East of the Oberteich were gardens and the Königsberg horse racing track. Along its shores were public baths (Prussia Badeanstalt, KSC-Badeanstalt, Hansa-Badeanstalt), a military bath, and an angling club.

The pond was transferred from Germany to the Soviet Union following World War II in 1945. The German consulate is located along the northern shore of the modern Upper Pond.

== Gallery ==
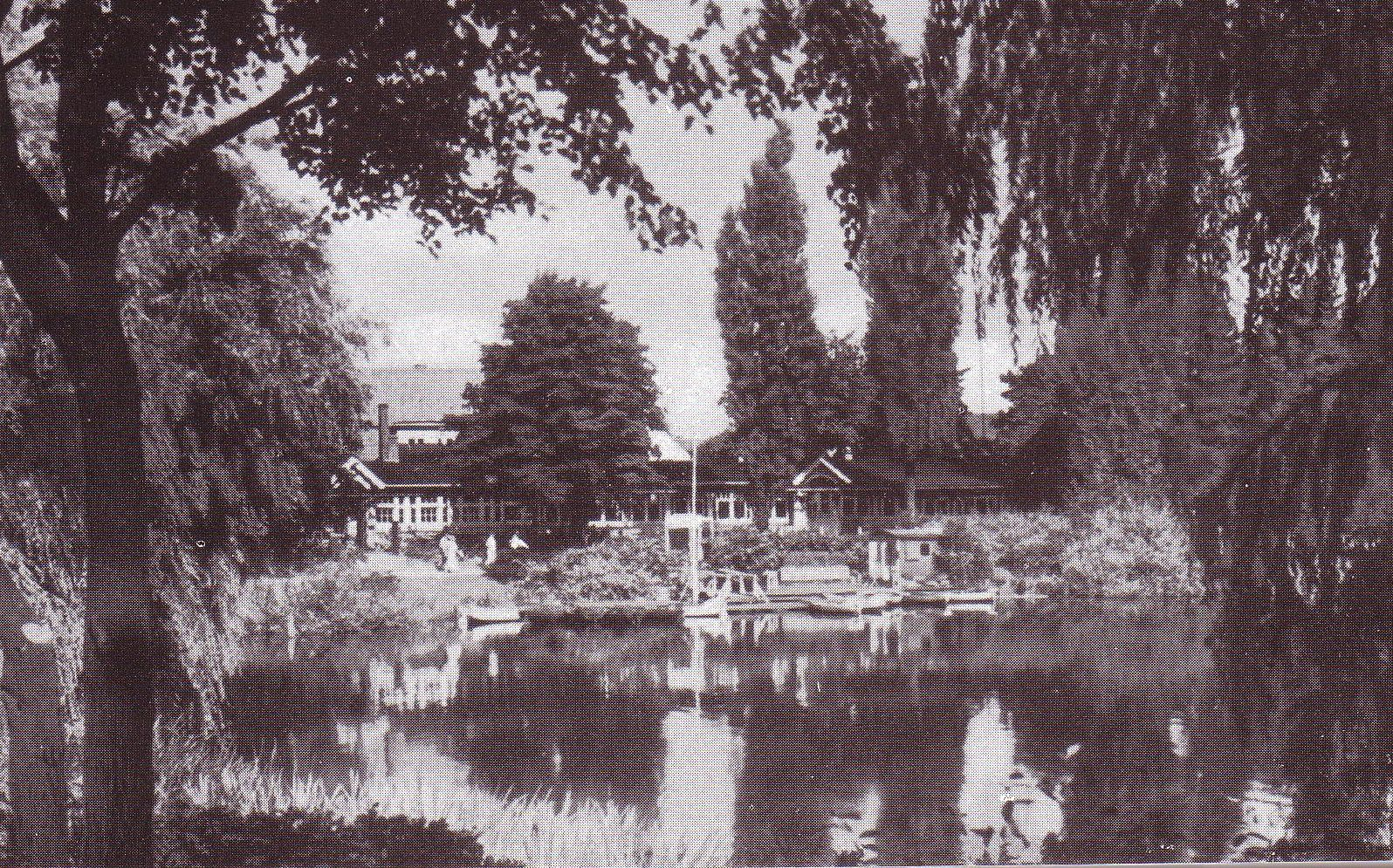
Former restaurant Oberteichterasse in Königsberg

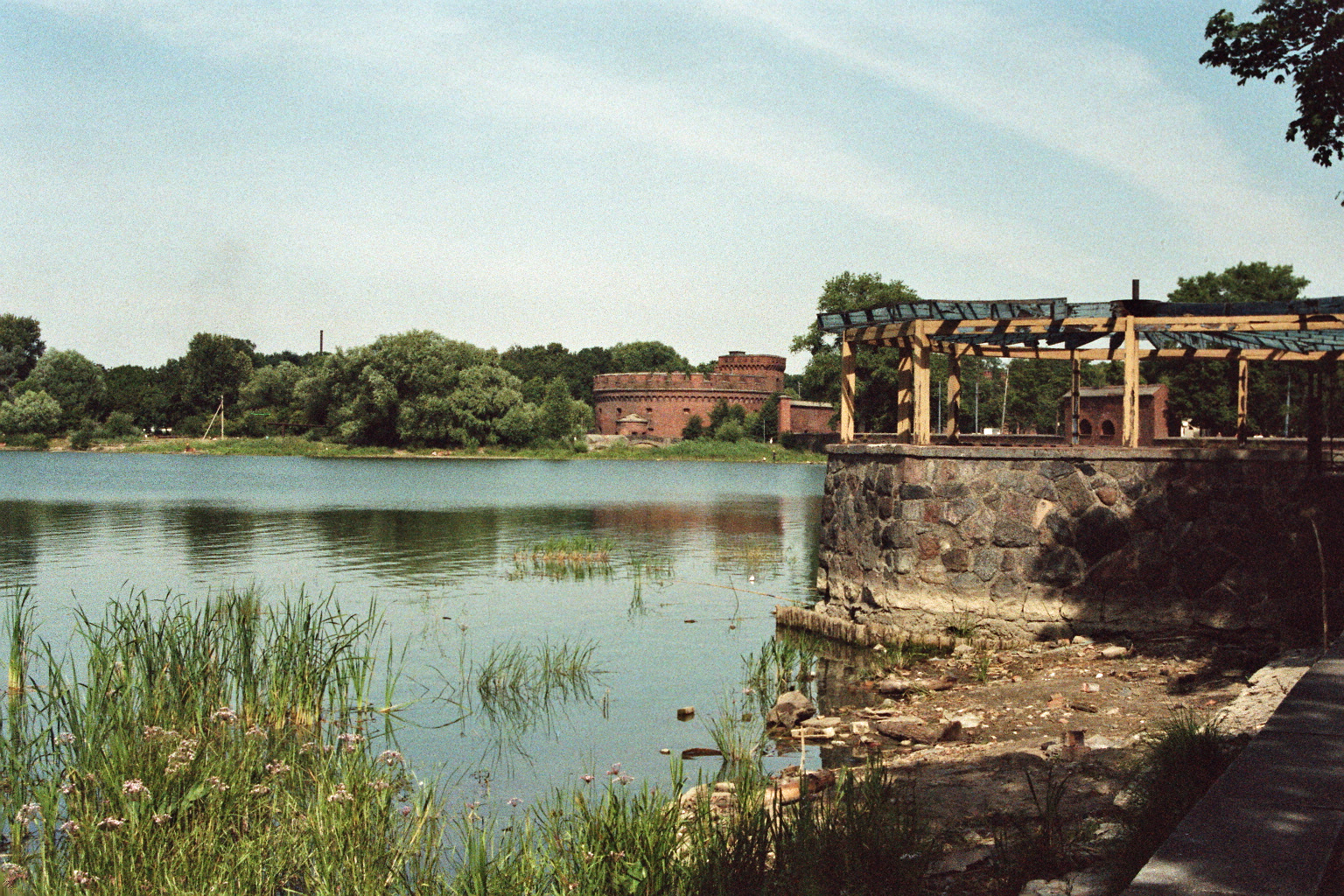
Upper Pond vicinity, ca. 1982. The Kaliningrad Amber Museum is in the background.
