= Tragheimsdorf =

Tragheimsdorf was a quarter of northern Königsberg, Germany. Its territory is now part of Kaliningrad, Russia.

== History ==
Tragheimsdorf was originally a small village located north of Tragheim along the western shore of the Oberteich. It was incorporated into the city of Königsberg in 1908 and developed into a new quarter after the dismantling of Tragheim Gate in 1911. Neighboring quarters were Tragheim to the south, Vorderhufen to the west, and Tragheimer Palve to the north.

Several of the newly planned streets in Tragheimsdorf were named after battles and events from the War of the Sixth Coalition, such as Tauroggen, Großgörschen, Dennewitz, Probstheida, Wartenburg, and Nollendorf. Auguste-Viktoria-Allee was named after Empress Augusta Victoria, while Cäcilienallee honored Duchess Cecilie of Mecklenburg-Schwerin. Samitter Allee led to Tragheimer Palve.

The Handelshochschule, the only business school of its kind in then-eastern Germany. In eastern Tragheimsdorf along the shores of the Oberteich was the Prussia Badeanstalt, a public bath.
