= Sackheim Church =

Coordinates: 54°42′35″N 20°31′21″E

Sackheim Church (German: Sackheimer Kirche) was a Protestant church in the Sackheim quarter of Königsberg, Germany.

== History ==
While Sackheim's Prussian Lithuanians attended St. Elisabeth's, the quarter's Germans originally attended Löbenicht Church. When the latter church became too small for the growing community of Sackheim, the Sackheimers separated from Löbenicht and in 1638 received their own pastor, Georg Neuschilling from Danzig (Gdańsk). Construction of the new Lutheran church began in 1640, but was delayed for years when Catholics objected to its proximity to the Propsteikirche. Finally completed in 1648, Sackheim Church received its Josua Mosengel-designed organ designed by in 1707.

Because the church burned down in the great fire of 11 November 1764, it was rebuilt under the direction of Karl Ludwig Bergius and dedicated in 1769. Its Rococo spire was decorated with a gilded Lamb of God weathervane. Other notable aspects of the church were its Rococo altar, ornately decorated pulpit from 1769, and a sandstone baptismal font by Franz Andreas Threyne in 1940.

The church was heavily damaged by the 1944 Bombing of Königsberg and the 1945 Battle of Königsberg. The Soviet administration in Kaliningrad demolished the remains in the 1950s.
