= Steindamm Church =

Oldest church in today's Kaliningrad, Russia

Steindamm church
- Steindamm kirche
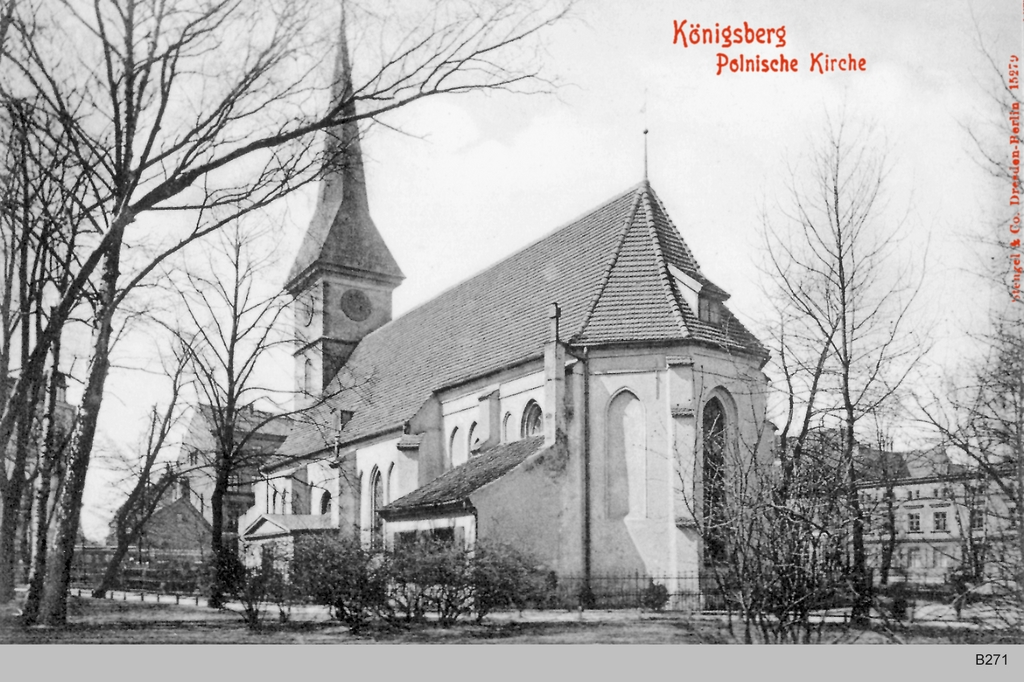
- Steindamm church
- 54°42′46.6″N 20°30′26.3″E
- Denomination: Lutheran
- Previous denomination: Catholic

History
- Status: Not preserved
- Founded: 1256
- Dedication: St. Nicholas

Architecture
- Years built: 1263-1710
- Closed: 1944
- Demolished: 1950

Steindamm Church (German: Steindammer Kirche; Polish: kościół na Steindamm), St Nicholas' Church (Nikolaikirche, or Nikolauskirche; Polish: kościół św. Mikołaja; Lithuanian: Šv. Mikalojaus bažnyčia už Karaliaučiaus miesto sienų), or Polish Church, Old Lithuanian Church (Polnische Kirche; Polish: kościół polski) was the oldest church in the city formerly known as Königsberg, and today known as Kaliningrad, Russia.

== History ==
The church's original form was a wooden Catholic chapel of Saint Nicholas first documented in 1256. It was built at Königsberg's first German settlement, located northwest of Königsberg Castle. After the original settlement was destroyed during the Siege of Königsberg, the church was rebuilt in stone in 1263. The suburb of Altstadt which developed around the church and replaced the first German settlement became known as Steindamm.

The small cemetery church affiliated with Altstadt Church was converted to Lutheranism in 1525 with the creation of the Duchy of Prussia. It was granted to non-German Protestants with service in the vernacular; services for Lithuanians had started in 1523. Most of the non-Germans were Masurians and Prussian Lithuanians from ducal Prussia, while a minority were religious refugees from the Kingdom of Poland and the Grand Duchy of Lithuania. The church was renovated or rebuilt anew at a cost of 700 Mark. It remained poor, however, not having its own parish or revenue.

In 1529 Johannes Wnorowius (Jan Wnorowski) became the first Polish-speaking preacher at the Steindamm church. Seclucianus (Jan Seklucjan) translated the New Testament into Polish there during the 1540s. Lithuanian-speaking preachers included Bartholomeus Willentius (Wilentis, died 1587) in 1554 and his successor, Johann Bretke. Sharing of the church caused disputes between the Poles and Lithuanians, however, and the pastors could sometimes not hear themselves over the din. After the death of Bretke in 1602, the Poles increased their efforts to control the church. In 1603 the Protestant Lithuanians received St. Elizabeth's Church in Sackheim for themselves, after the Catholic Jesuits had become interested in the situation.

As St. Nicholas' Church in Steindamm had become predominantly Polish, it was nicknamed the Polish Church. The consistory granted a second priest to the church in 1613 because of the size of the congregation. All new Polish-speaking pastors of the church were born in East Prussia and educated in Königsberg; none came from Poland. The church was used for Orthodox services during the occupation of Königsberg by the Imperial Russian Army from 1758 to 1762 during the Seven Years' War, after which Lutheran services resumed in Polish. Otto Nicolai was baptized in the church on 21 June 1810. During the French invasion of Russia in 1812, it was used as a jail and field hospital.

Because of declining demand, the church's Polish sermons stopped in 1874, with weekly Polish-language service continuing only for soldiers from Masuria. In 1880 a new parish for Steindamm separate from that of New Altstadt Church was created from parts of Altstadt, Löbenicht, Tragheim, and Neurossgarten. Polish service for Masurians ceased altogether in 1901 as the Masurian soldiers sufficiently understood German. In 1928 it was cleansed of defective plaster from the Baroque era.

Although Steindamm Church survived the 1944 Bombing of Königsberg in World War II, it was destroyed by Red Army artillery during the 1945 Battle of Königsberg. The remains were demolished by the Soviet administration in Kaliningrad in 1950 to expand the thoroughfare Leninskiy Prospekt.

== Design ==
By the first quarter of the 14th century, the church consisted of a large single-nave with three vaulted bays and a large wheel window on the southern entrance. Its steeple was built during the 15th century. After collapsing in 1559 without injury, its reconstructed spire was completed in 1710. By the 20th century the choir's three keystones depicted the coat of arms of Altstadt, Adam and Eve, and a no longer legible inscription.

The church's triptych by Anton Möller in 1586 depicted Judgement Day, while its framing was probably designed by Michael Doebel the Elder in 1690. A slender Salvator Mundi from 1706 was located on the pulpit's wall. The pulpit was decorated in Rococo style in 1760.

== Gallery ==
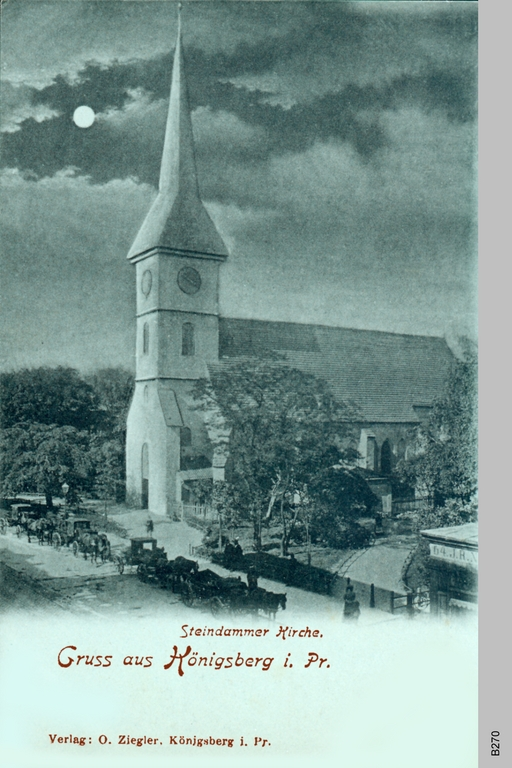
Steindamm Church ca. 1908

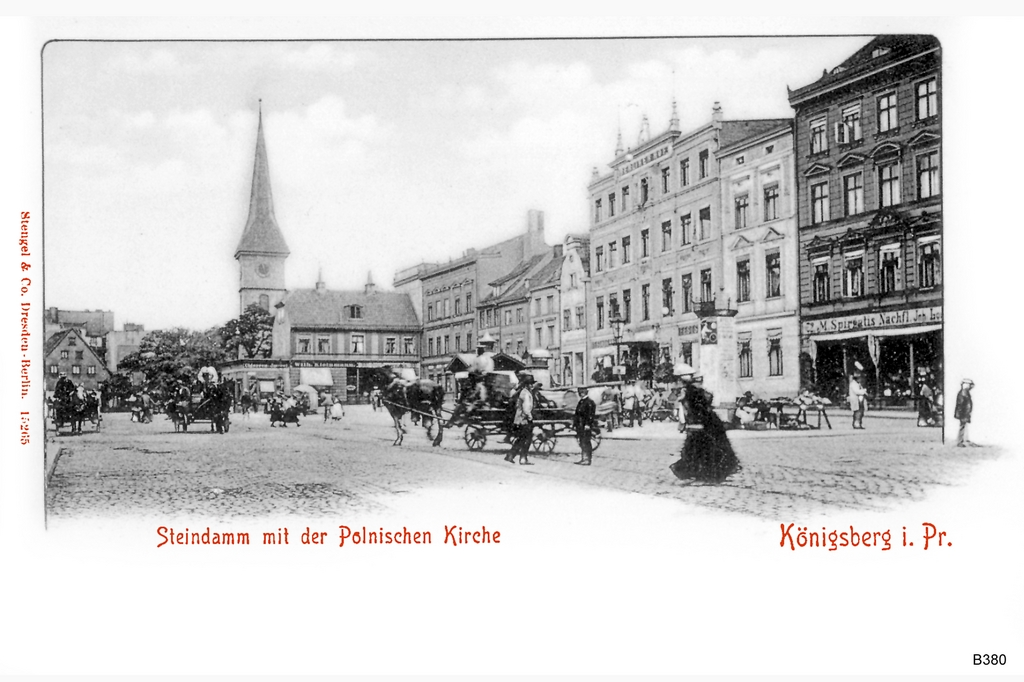
Steindamm and its church, ca. 1908

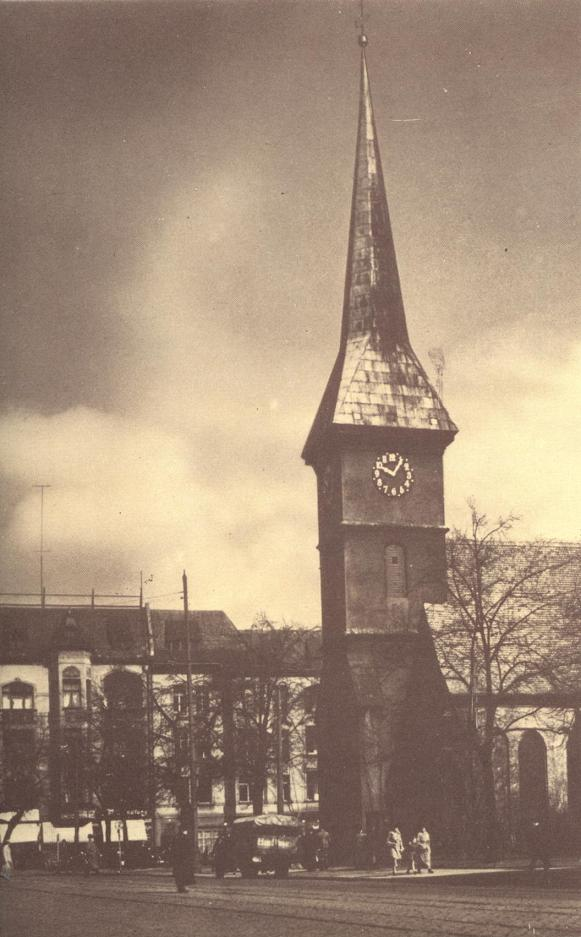
Steindamm Church ca. 1930

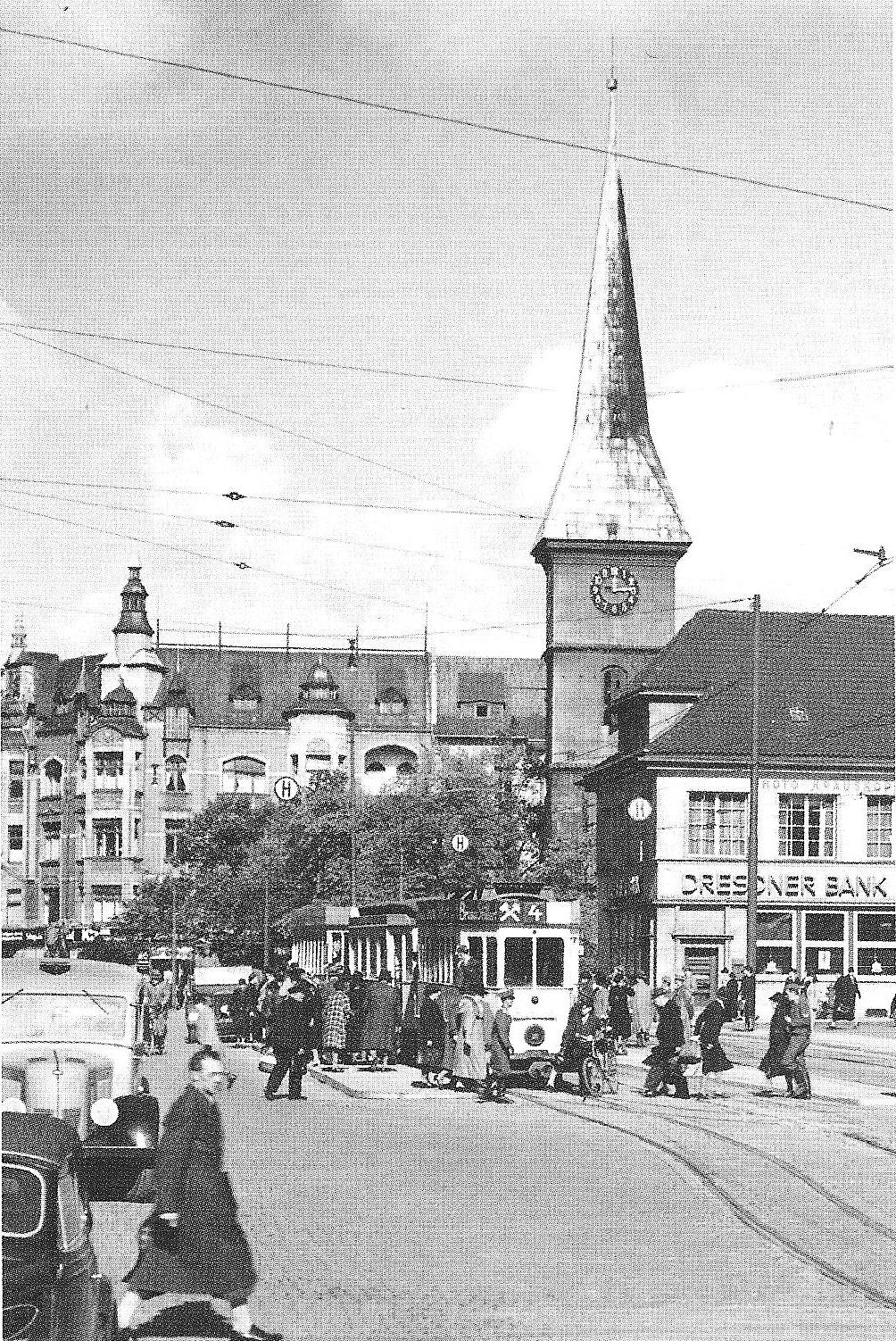
Steindamm Church ca. 1940; a branch of Dresdner Bank AG is visible in the foreground

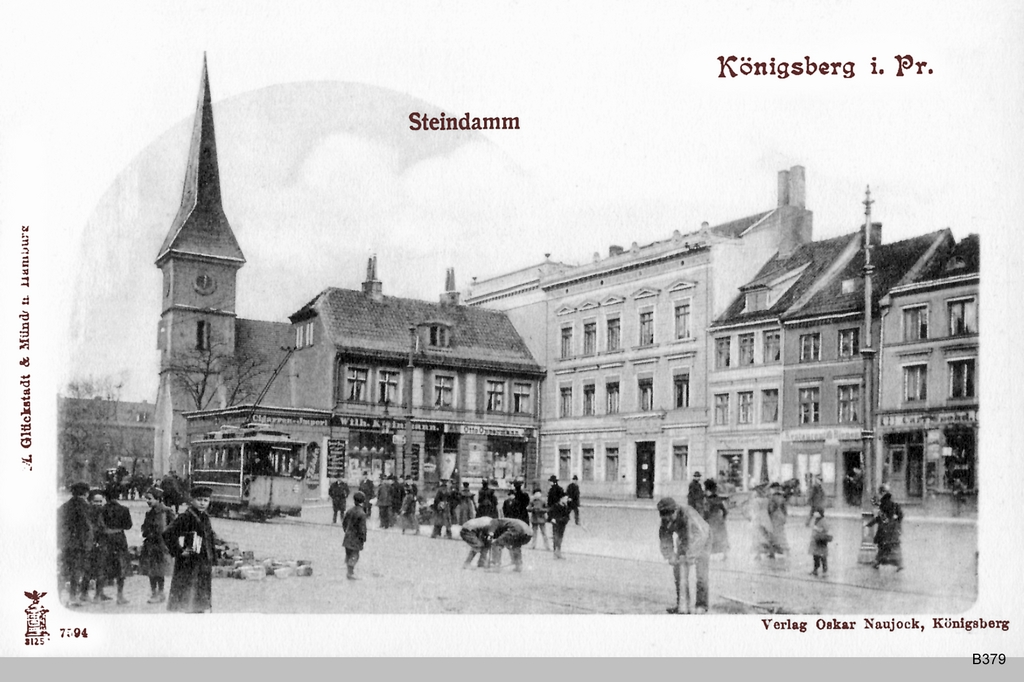
Steindamm church, beginning of 20th century.

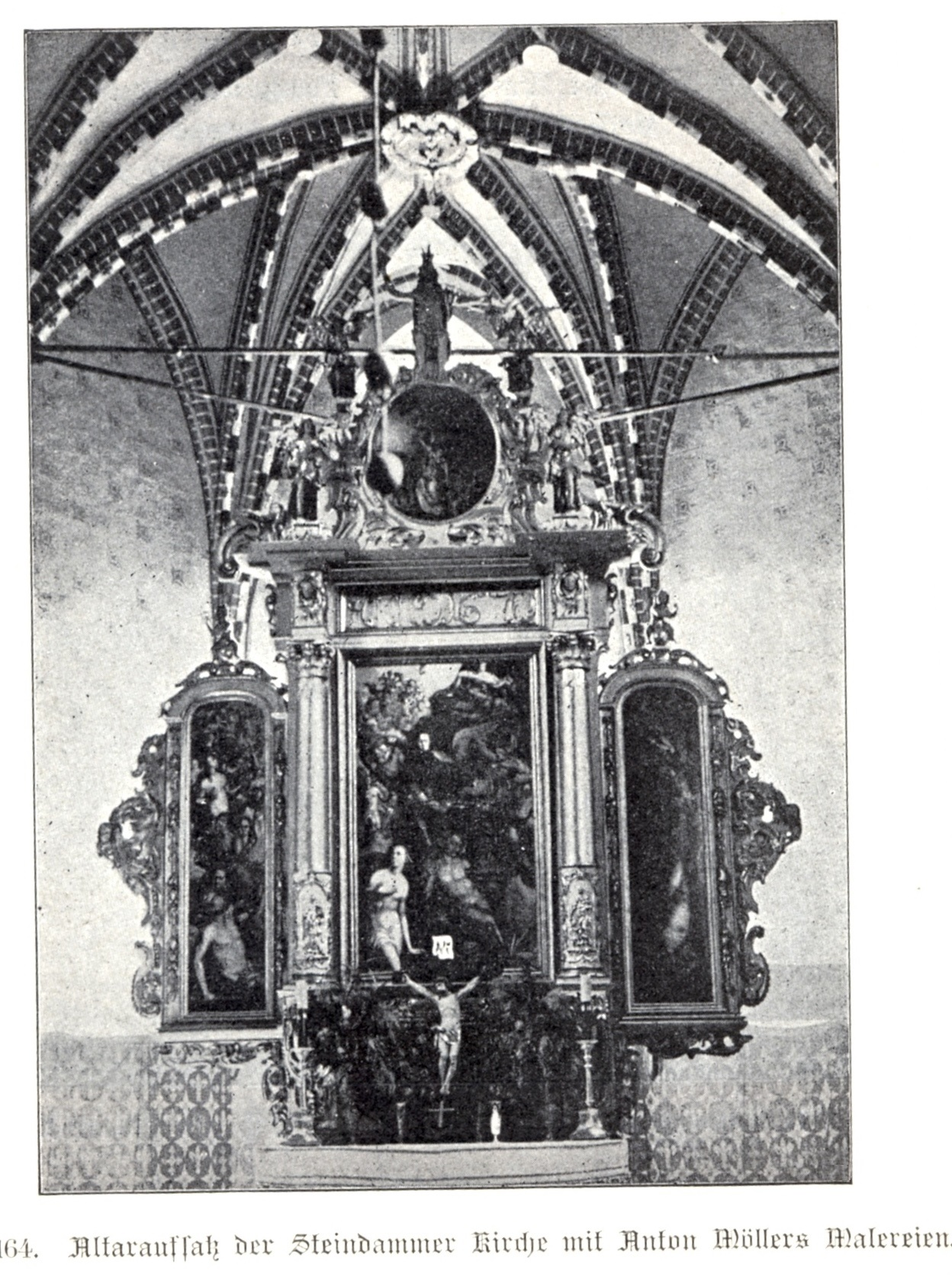
Steindamm church altar, triptych by Anton Möller.

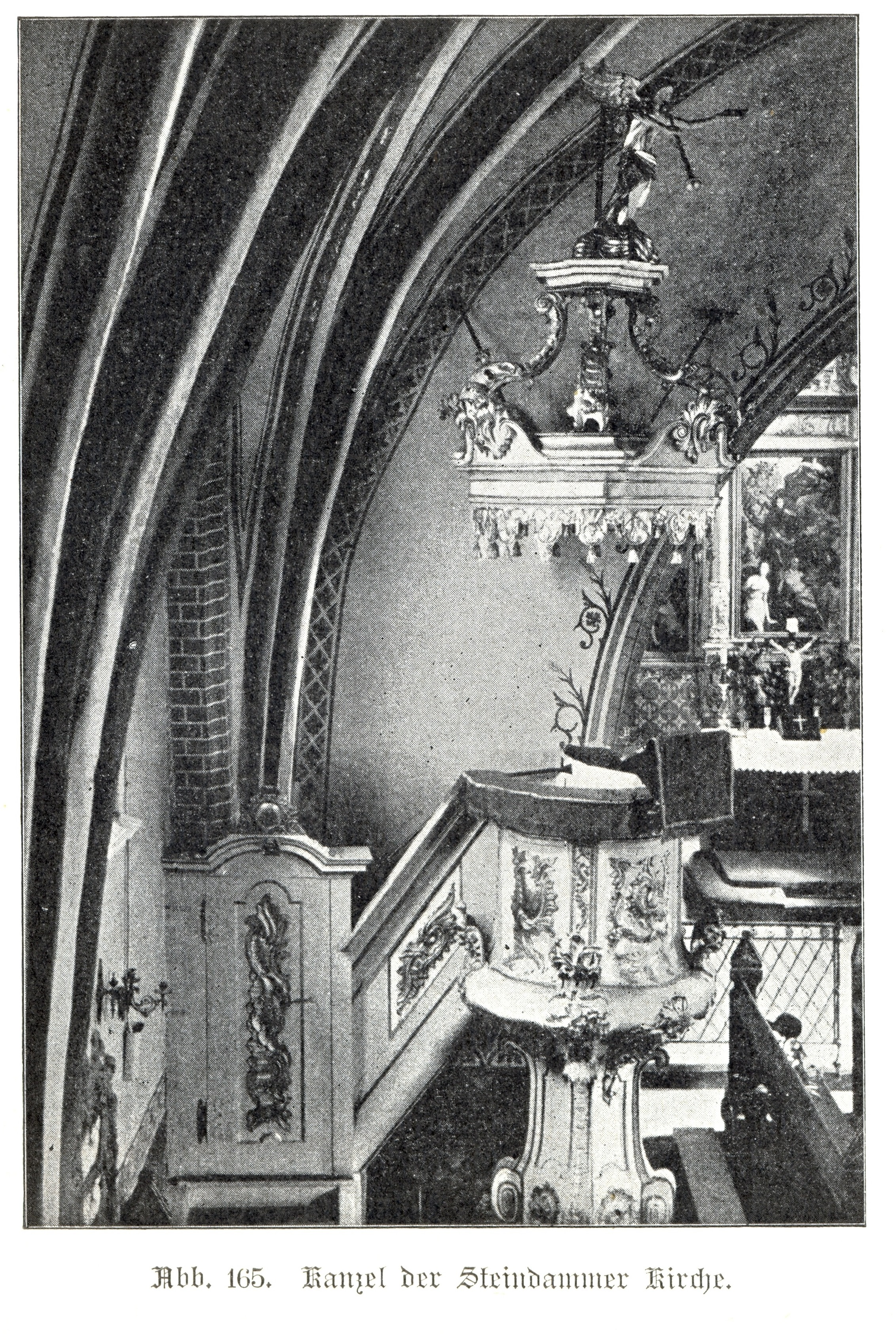
Steindamm church Rococo style pulpit and sounding board.
