= Löbenicht =

Coordinates: 54°42′35″N 20°31′03″E

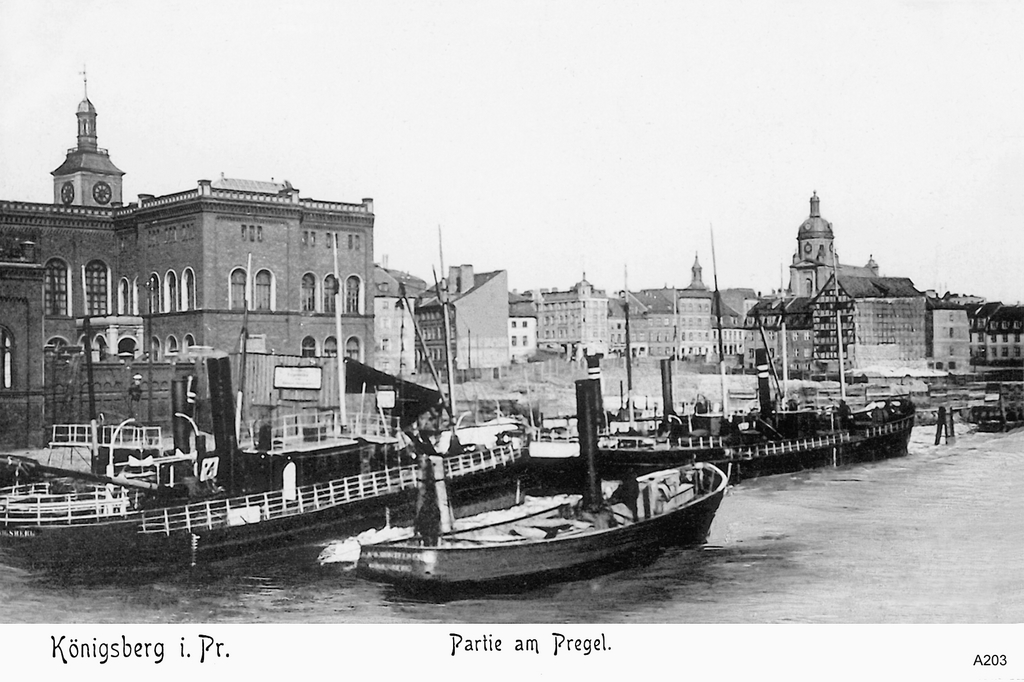
View of Löbenicht from the Pregel, including its church and gymnasium, as well as the nearby Propsteikirche

Löbenicht (Polish: Lipnik; Lithuanian: Lyvenikė) was a quarter of central Königsberg, Prussia. During the Middle Ages it was the weakest of the three towns that composed the city of Königsberg, the others being Altstadt and Kneiphof. Its territory is now part of the Leningradsky District of Kaliningrad, Russia.

== History ==
=== Early history ===
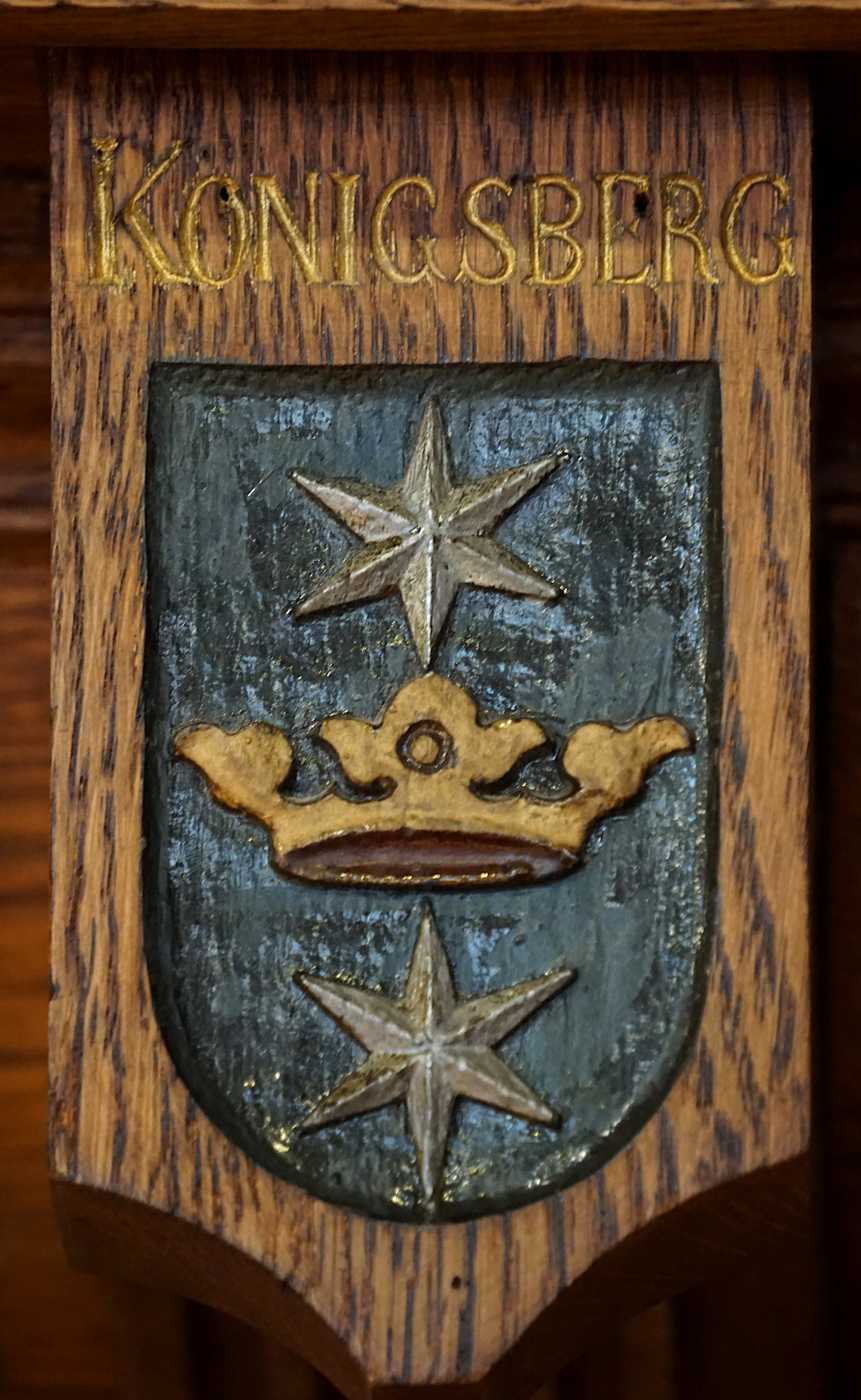
Coat of arms of Löbenicht in the Old Town Hall, Gdańsk

The predecessor of Löbenicht was the Old Prussian fishing village Lipnick (also Liepenick and Lipnicken, meaning swamp village) with its harbor Lipza, which was conquered by the Teutonic Knights during the 1255 conquest of Samland. Although an initial German colony northwest of Königsberg Castle was destroyed during the 1262 Siege of Königsberg, the Altstadt (German for "old town") south of the castle was granted Kulm town rights in 1286. By the end of the 13th century settlement had spread east of Altstadt to Löbenicht. Altstadt and the new settlement of craftsmen and farmers were divided by the Lebo or Löbe, later known as the Katzbach, a stream running from the Schlossteich to the Pregel River. The Königsberg Komtur, Berthold Brühaven, awarded the new settlement Kulm town rights in 1300. Although it was documented in 1299 as Nova civitas (Neustadt, new town), it was known as Löbenicht by 1338. Königsberg's third town, Kneiphof, was founded in 1327. Each town had its own charter, market rights, church, and fortifications.

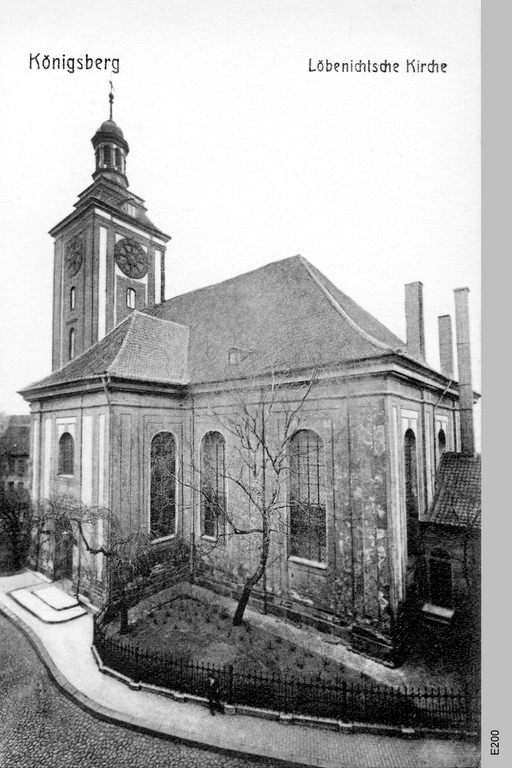
Löbenicht Church in 1908

Löbenicht was the least powerful of Königsberg's three towns; unlike Kneiphof, Löbenicht was not a rival to Altstadt. Löbenicht's small Freiheiten suburbs were Anger to the east and Stegen to the southeast. These districts were granted to Löbenicht by Grand Master Frederick of Saxony in 1506. Anger contained Löbenicht's warehouses (see also Lastadie) and farmland. Stegen (or Steegen), originally used for lumber, developed into the Neuer Markt (new market). Outlying villages and estates eventually controlled by Löbenicht included Ponarth, Maraunen, Quednau, Radnicken, and the tile factory near the Oberteich. Aside from Anger and Stegen, Löbenicht was bordered by Burgfreiheit to the north, Rossgarten to the northeast, Neue Sorge to the east, Sackheim to the southeast, and Altstadt to the west.

=== Thirteen Years' War ===
Altstadt and Kneiphof sent representatives to the Prussian Confederation in 1440, although Löbenicht did not. As members of the Confederation, the Königsberg towns rebelled against the Teutonic Knights on 4 February 1454 at the beginning of the Thirteen Years' War and allied with King Casimir IV Jagiellon of Poland. The rebellion in Königsberg was supported by the merchant class and led by Altstadt's mayor, Andreas Brunau. Based upon the example of Danzig (Gdańsk), Brunau hoped to turn Königsberg into an autonomous city with control over all Sambia. On 19 June Löbenicht's Bürgermeister, Hermann Stulmacher, paid fealty to the Polish chancellor, Jan Taszka Koniecpolski, confirming the city's accession to Poland. However, Brunau lost the support of Altstadt and Löbenicht on 24 March 1455 due to spontaneous opposition from craftsmen and workers, with the rebels retreating to Kneiphof. Löbenicht supported Plauen and Altstadt during the siege of the Kneiphof. The island town surrendered to Komtur Heinrich Reuß von Plauen on 14 July.

=== Later history ===
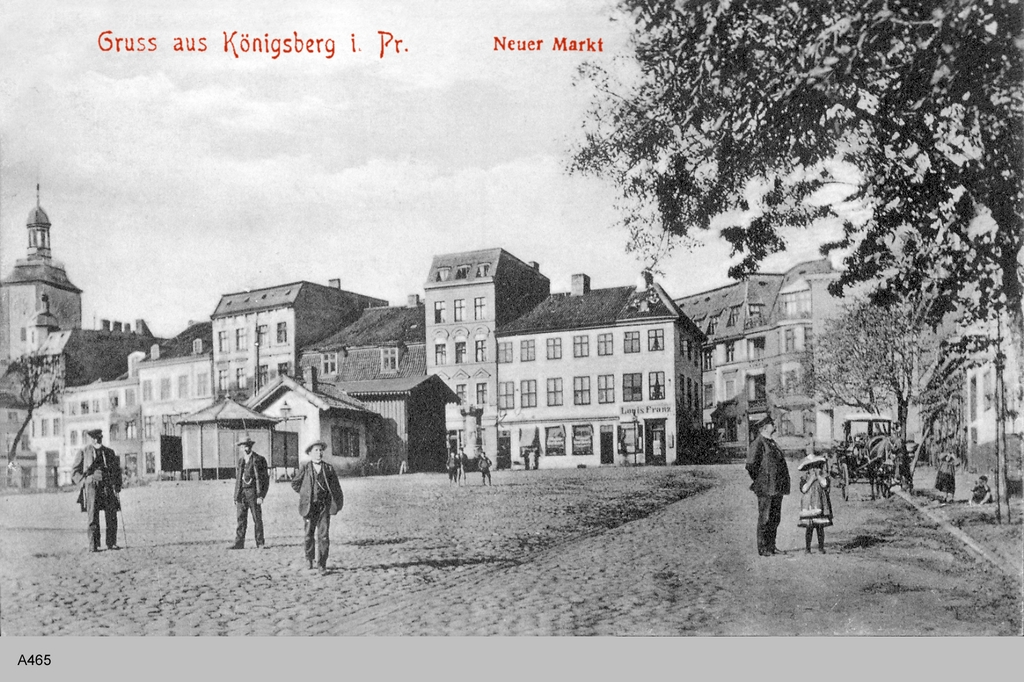
View of the Neuer Markt and Löbenicht Church

Polish church services were held in the local church from 1618 to 1817.

Löbenicht became part of the Kingdom of Prussia in 1701. In the same year the three towns resisted the efforts of Burgfreiheit to form a proposed fourth town, Friedrichsstadt. By the Rathäusliche Reglement of 13 June 1724, King Frederick William I of Prussia merged Altstadt, Löbenicht, Kneiphof, and their respective suburbs into the united city of Königsberg. Königsberg Castle and its suburbs remained separate until the Städteordnung of Stein on 19 November 1808 during the era of Prussian reforms. Much of Löbenicht, including its church, school, and hospital, burned down in a widespread fire on 11 November 1764 and had to be rebuilt.

Löbenicht was heavily damaged during the 1944 Bombing of Königsberg and 1945 Battle of Königsberg during World War II. Buildings which survived the war were subsequently demolished by the Soviet administration in Kaliningrad.

== Buildings ==
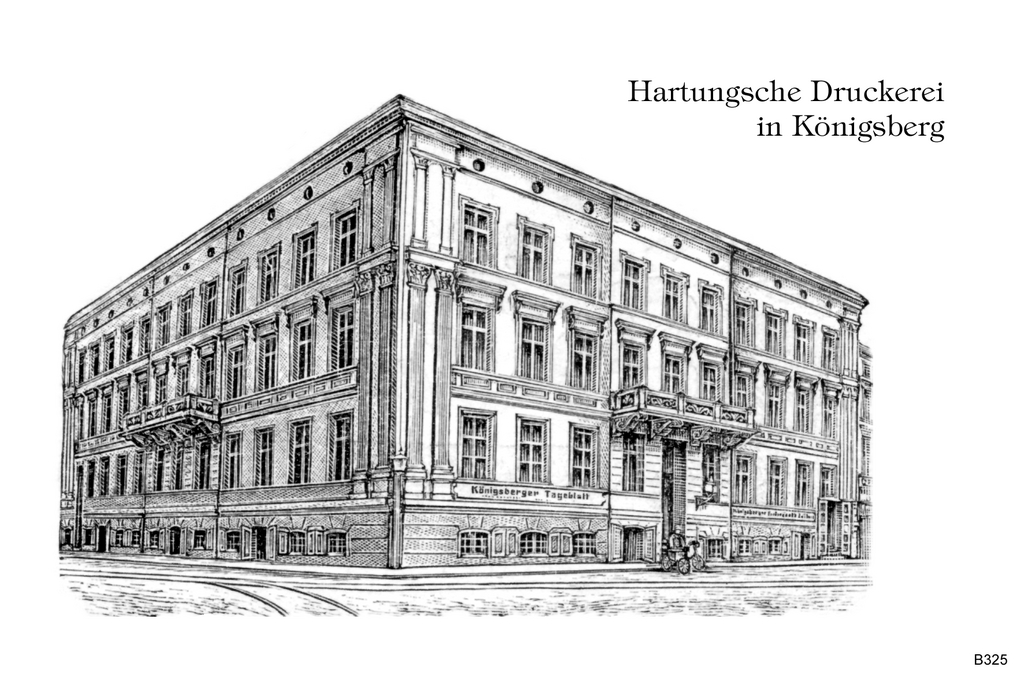
The publisher Hartung'sche Verlagsdruckerei was based in the former Löbenicht Town Hall from 1876 to 1906.

The Löbenicht Town Hall was later used by Hartung Verlag, one of the city's largest newspaper publishers. The Protestant Löbenicht Church dated back to the 14th century and was rebuilt in the Rococo style in the 18th century. The quarter's secondary school was Löbenicht Realgymnasium, also known as the Städtisches Realgymnasium.

In 1531 a convent in Löbenicht was converted into a hospital, which lasted until the great fire of 1764. The large rebuilt Löbenicht Hospital was dedicated in 1772. It was deteriorating by the 20th century, however, and was dismantled in 1903. Löbenicht Hospital's third incarnation was built not in Löbenicht, but on Heidemannstraße near Sackheim Gate in eastern Sackheim.

Most of Königberg's breweries were located in Löbenicht during the 19th century, but by the 20th century they had been replaced by larger breweries in Ponarth, Schönbusch, and Wickbold.
