= Löbenicht Realgymnasium =

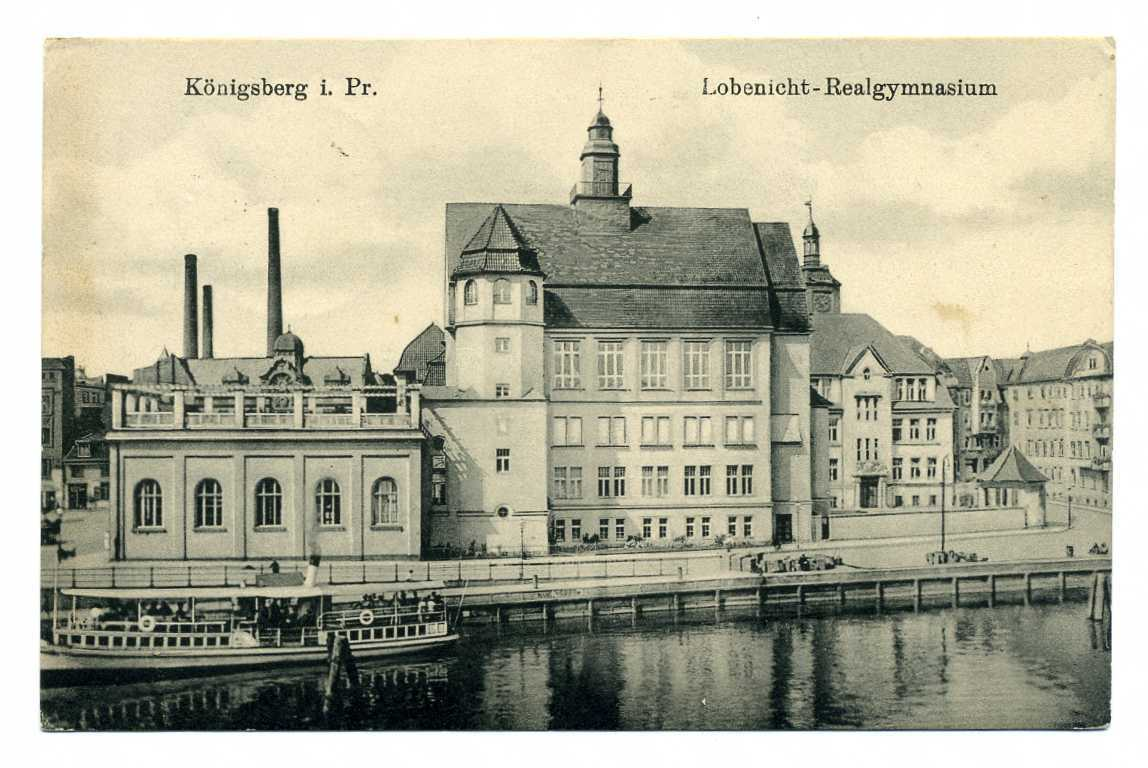

Location
- 54°42′30″N 20°31′03″E

Information
- Established: ca. 1333
- Status: Closed
- Closed: 1944

Löbenicht Realgymnasium (German: Löbenichtsches Realgymnasium or Städtisches Realgymnasium) was a gymnasium in the Löbenicht quarter of Königsberg, Germany.

== History ==
A parochial school affiliated with Löbenicht Church was documented in 1441, but it had probably been founded shortly after the church's construction ca. 1333. It became a Latin school in 1525 during the Protestant Reformation and creation of the Duchy of Prussia. The school was expanded in 1581 and rebuilt in 1644. The great fire of Löbenicht on 11 November 1764 destroyed the church and caused its steeple to fall upon the school and set it ablaze. The school was rebuilt soon after, however, and rededicated on 23 March 1768.

The school was acquired by the city from the church in 1810 and developed into a Höhere Bürgerschule in 1811. Löbenicht's school moved to a new brick building, built from 1855 to 1859 at Münchenhofplatz, and became a municipal Realschule. On 16 October 1865 it became an Oberrealschule with 357 students. Under the leadership of director Alexander Schmidt it became a Realgymnasium in 1882. The building was expanded and a gym added in 1895 at a cost of 120,600 Mark. Its library contained 4,000 volumes.

Through the efforts of Director Otto Wittrin, a new building for the Realgymnasium designed by Karl Glage was constructed from 1911 to 1914 on land once used by the dismantled Löbenicht Hospital. Frescoes by Otto Ewel decorated its auditorium.

Pastor Johann Funk (1792-1867), architect Friedrich Lahrs (1880-1964), and Nazi Party lawyer Ludwig Bänfer attended the institution, while Paul Stettiner (1862-1941) taught there in 1887. In 1902 it consisted of 16 teachers and 331 students. The building was destroyed during the 1944 bombing of Königsberg in World War II.

== Gallery ==
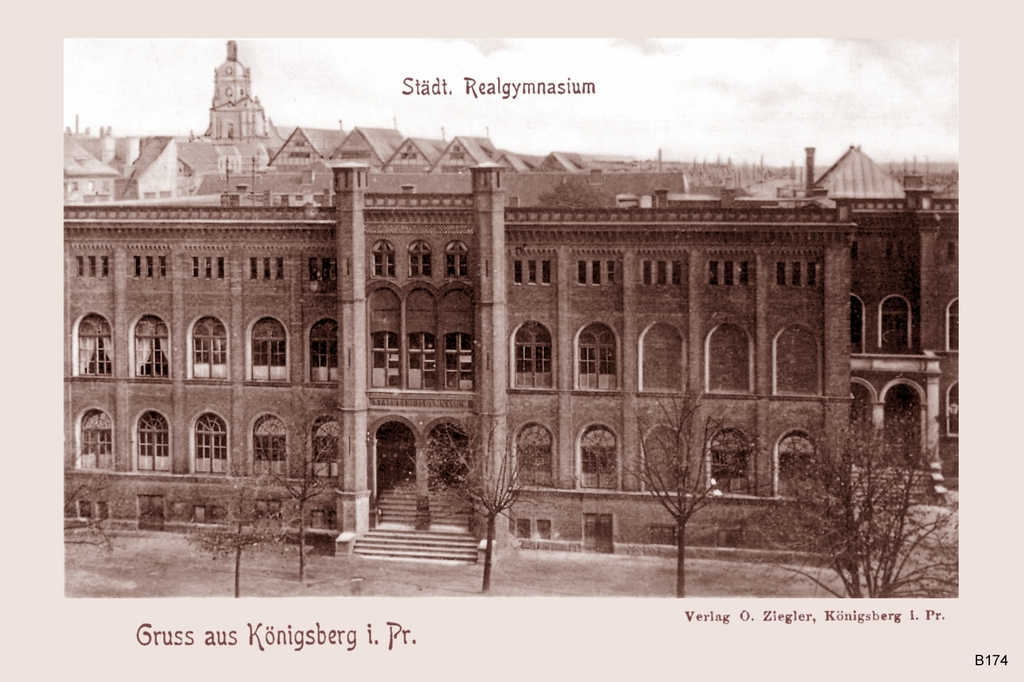
Löbenicht Realgymnasium

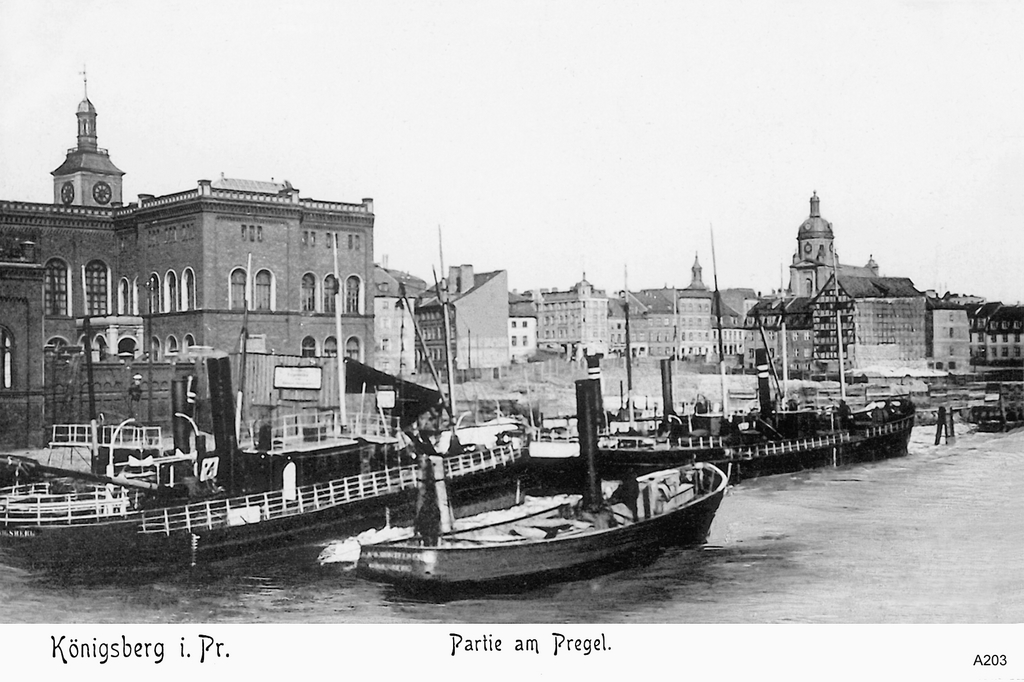
View from the Pregel of Löbenicht, with the gymnasium, Löbenicht Church, and Propsteikirche

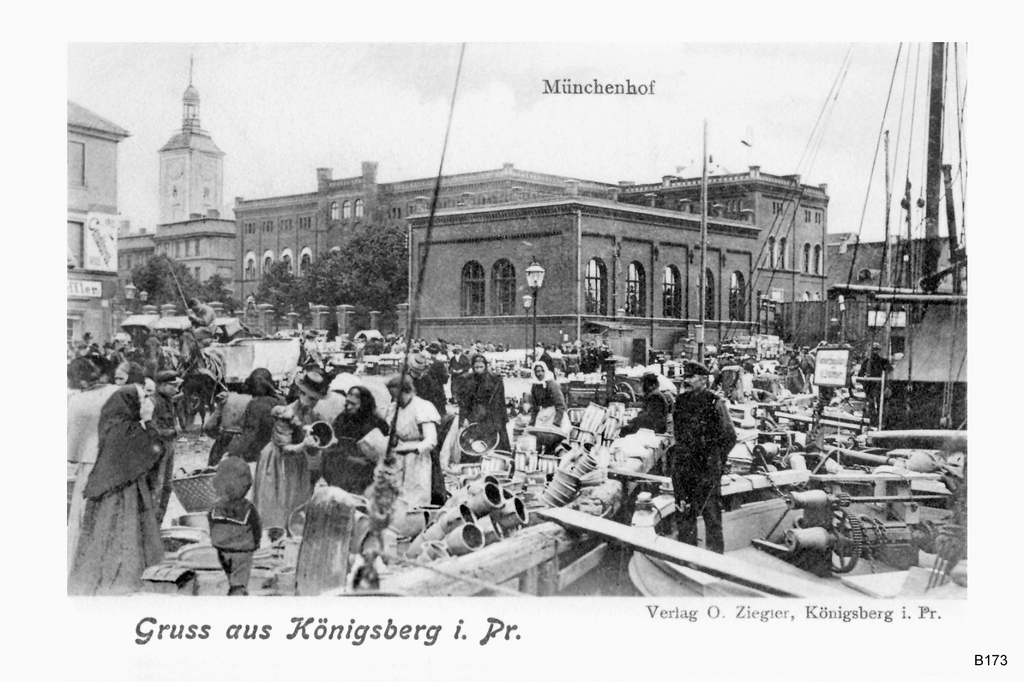
Münchenhofplatz with the gymnasium, church, and fish market
