= Ludwig Bänfer =

German jurist (1890–1964)

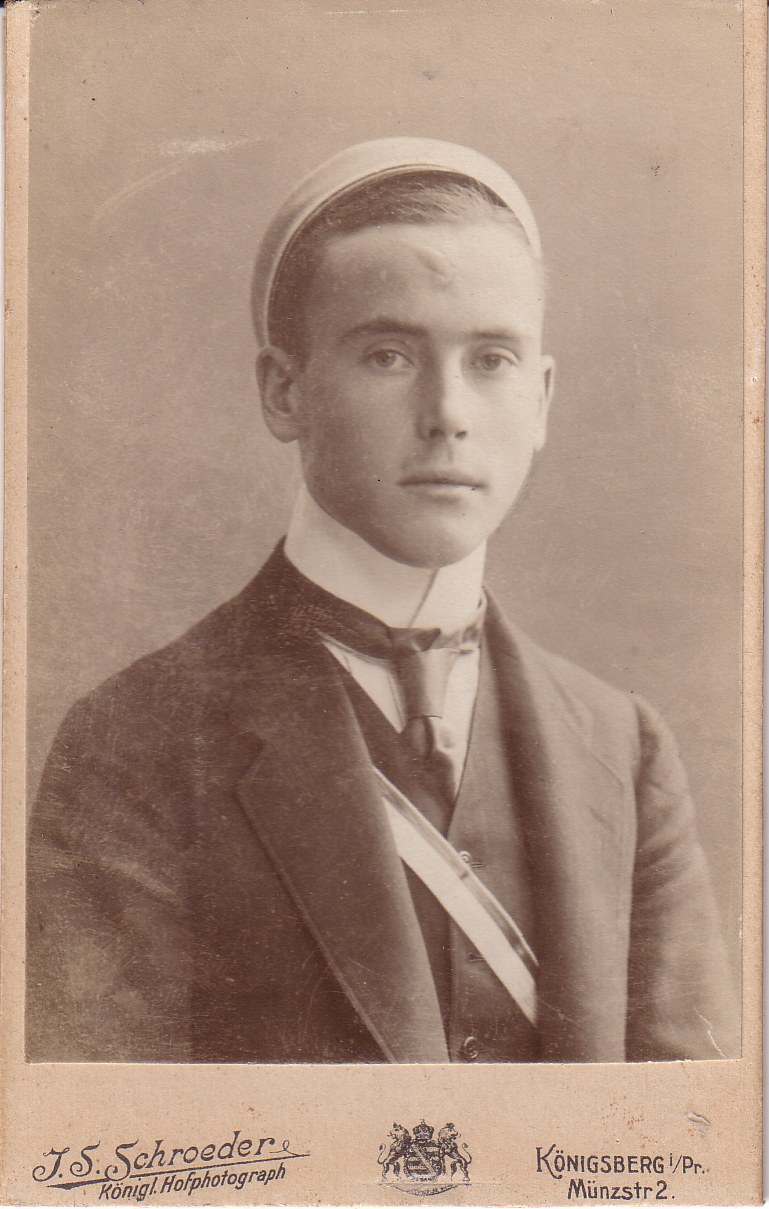
- Ludwig Bänfer in 1908
- Born: 6 February 1890; Steinfurt, German Empire
- Died: 17 July 1964 (aged 74); Salzburg, Austria
- Military career
- Allegiance: German Empire; Weimar Republic; Nazi Germany
- Branch: Imperial German Army
- Service years: 1914–1918
- Conflicts: World War I; Eastern Front; Western Front
- Awards: Iron Cross

Ludwig Bänfer (6 February 1890 – 17 July 1964) was a German lawyer, politician, World War I veteran and Nazi Party member.

== Biography ==
Bänfer came to East Prussia as a child and attended the Löbenicht Realgymnasium. After graduating from high school, he studied law at the University of Königsberg, With Alfred Prang and Franz Willuhn, he became active in the Corps Masovia Königsberg (Potsdam) in the summer of 1908.

During the First World War he fought in both the Eastern and Western Front and was awarded the Iron Cross. He worked in different positions during the Weimar Republic and later joined the NSDAP (Nazi Party) and served as Ministerial Council between 1937 and 1945.

After the end of the war, he was captured by British forces and remained under arrest for some time before being left to Zonal Advisory Council (ZAC). After complete release he retired and moved to Hanover in 1955.

He died in Salzburg in 1964 at the age of 74.
