= Tragheim Church =

Protestant church

Tragheim church
- Tragheim kirche
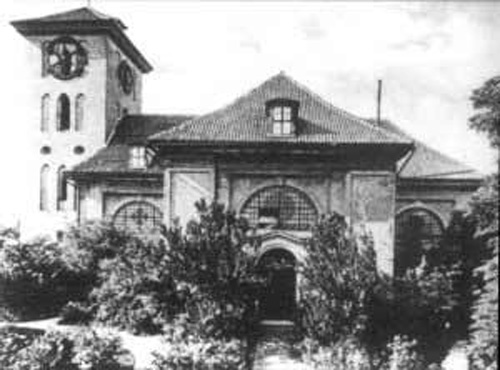
- Tragheim church, c. 1930.
- Tragheim church
- 54°42′59″N 20°30′23″E
- Denomination: Lutheran

History
- Status: Not preserved
- Founded: 1626

Architecture
- Architect: Joachim Ludwig Schultheiss von Unfriedt
- Years built: 1708-1710
- Closed: 1944
- Demolished: 1950s

Tragheim Church (German: Tragheimer Kirche) was a Protestant church in the Tragheim quarter of Königsberg, Germany.

== History ==
At the beginning of the 17th century the Lutheran residents of Tragheim attended Löbenicht Church and were buried in Steindamm's cemetery. Because Löbenicht Church was too small for the growing community, Duke George William sold to Tragheim a square containing an old brick or tile manufactory on 23 May 1624. The Tragheimers moved their cemetery to their new square and constructed a small chapel from 1626 to 1632.

The new church was dedicated in 1632 and received its own pastor in 1636. The first five pastors of the church were non-Prussians: Johann Benedikt Reinhardi was from Erfurt, Mauritius Karoli was from Brandenburg, Wolfgang Springer was from Holstein, Daniel Erasmi was from Frankfurt (Oder), and Thomas Masecovius was from Königsberg in der Neumark. In 1696 Jacob Heinrich Ohlius (1650-1725) became the first native of Prussia to be pastor in Tragheim.

Because the original church collapsed in 1707, a new church was constructed from 1708 to 1710 according to designs by architect Joachim Ludwig Schultheiss von Unfriedt (1678-1753), with patronage from Friedrich Kupner. Its Baroque steeple was completed in 1723. When Tragheim Church burned down after a lightning strike in 1783, it was rebuilt the following year according to Schultheiss von Unfriedt's original design, under the direction of Johann Samuel Lilienthal (1724-1799) and Johann Ernst Jester. Its tented roof steeple was incomplete at that time, however.

Ehregott Andreas Christoph Wasianski (July 3, 1755 - April 17, 1831) - a secretary (amanuensis), confidante, and biographer of the great German philosopher Immanuel Kant (1724-1804) - became the pastor of Tragheim Church in 1808.

Richard Wagner married Minna Planer (Christine Wilhelmine Planer) in Tragheim Church on 26 November 1836.

The church was heavily damaged in the Bombing of Königsberg (1944) and in the Battle of Königsberg (April 6–9, 1945).

The last pastors of the Tragheim Church were Schwandt, Friedrich Werner, Eduard Korallus (pastor from 1900 to 1933), and Paul Knapp (pastor from 1933 to 1944).

The remnants of the church were demolished by the Soviet administration in Kaliningrad, Russia during the 1950s.

== Sights ==
The church contained a Rococo chancellery and pulpit with beautiful carvings made in 1784 by tischlermeister (master carpenter) Carl Johann Grabowski of Königsberg. The neoclassical altarpiece was created by the wood-carver Christian Benjamin Schultz from Heilsberg, and donated to the church by the apothecary Johann Sigismund Tiepolt and his wife Susanne (née Bulle), who both died in 1800. The organ was designed in 1793/1794 by orgelbaumeister (master organ-builder) Christoph Wilhelm Braveleit (1751-1796). The church also contained an oil painting of E. A. C. Wasianski by Johann Friedrich Andreas Knorre (1763 - May 11, 1841), a distinguished portrait painter who was Director of the Provinzial-Kunst-und Zeichenschule (Provincial Art and Drawing School) in Königsberg from 1800 to 1841. Knorre also held the position of Professor of Drawing at the School.

== Gallery ==
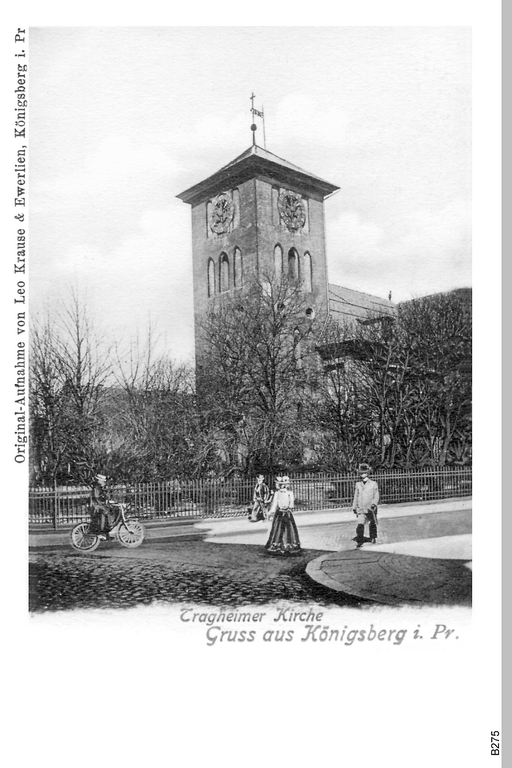
Tragheim Church, ca. 1908.

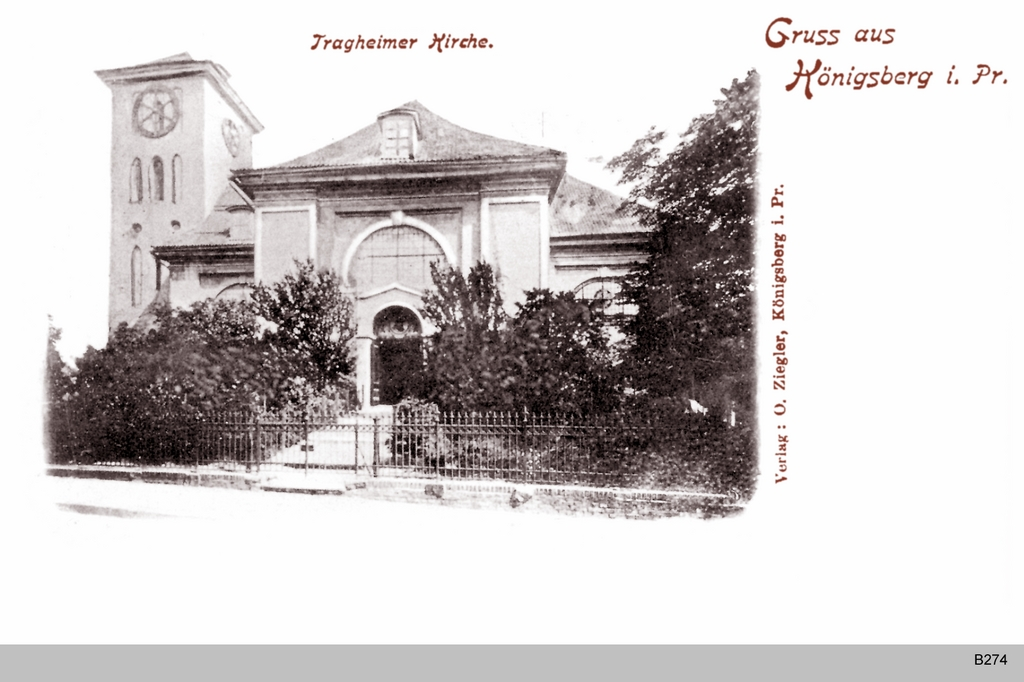
Tragheim Church, ca. 1908.

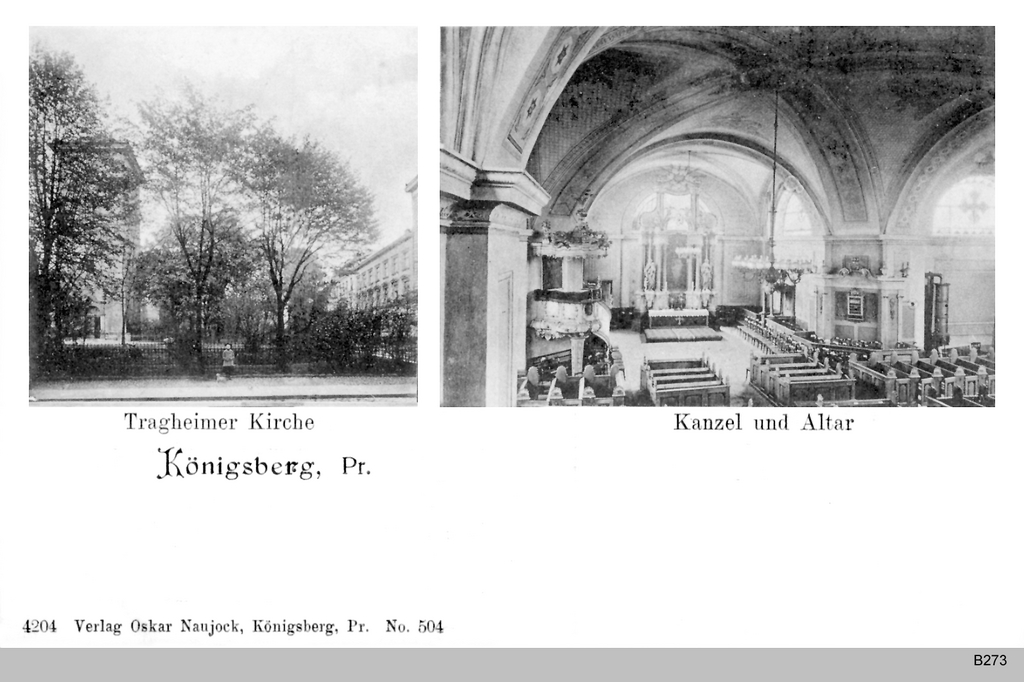
Exterior and interior.

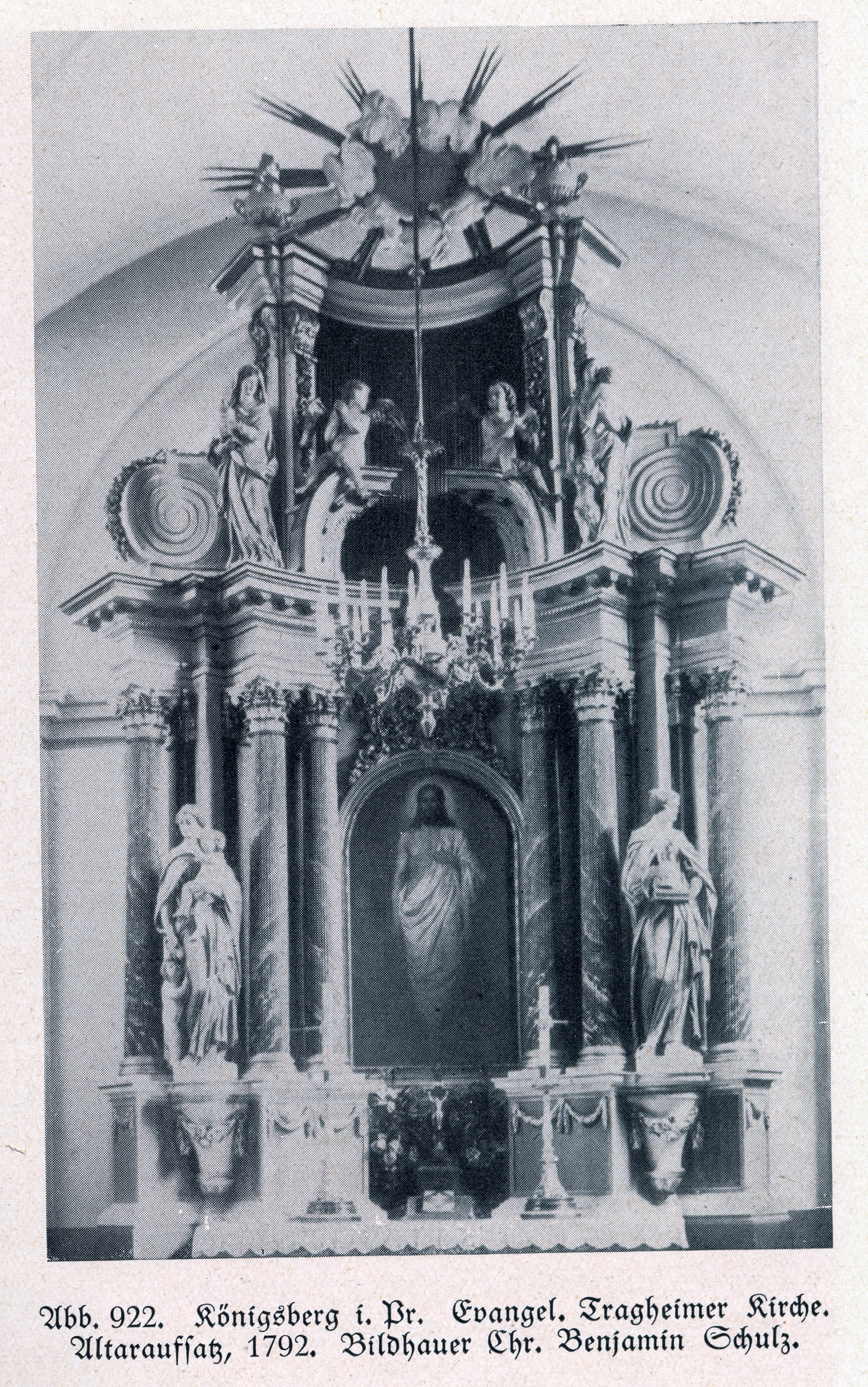
Altar by Chr. Benjamin Schulz, 1792.

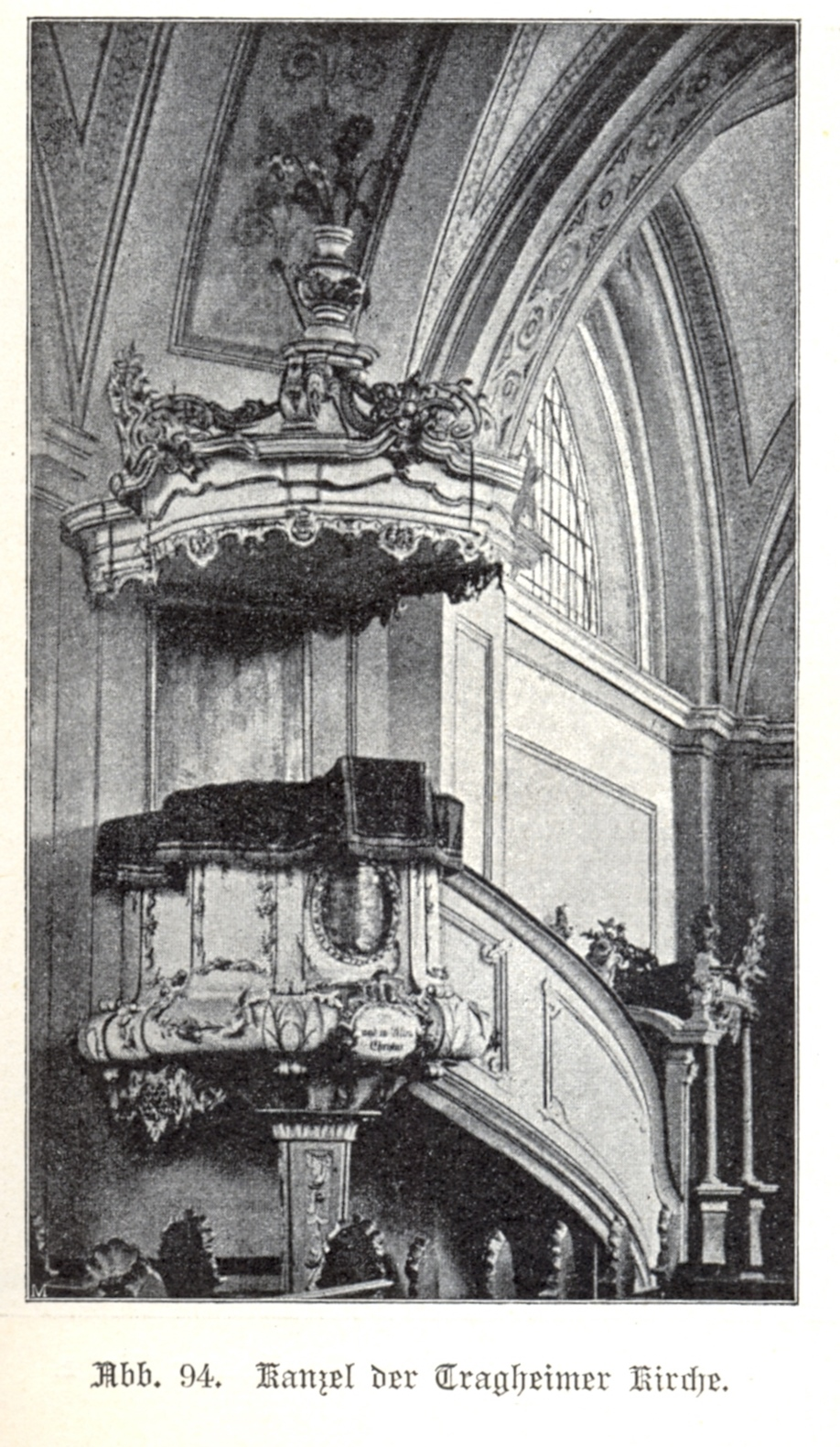
Pulpit with sounding board in Tragheim church.
