= Bertold Brühaven =

Bertold Brühaven (Latin: Bertoldus Bruhave), also known as Berthold von Brühaven or Berthold von Bruehaven, was a Teutonic knight hailed from the then Duchy of Austria; served in Prussia as the Komtur of Balga in 1288–1289, the first Komtur of Ragnit in 1289, then the Komtur of Königsberg in from 1289 to 1302.

Bertold Brühaven's military career is emphasized in two versions of The Chronicle of the Prussian Land by Peter of Dusburg and Nikolaus von Jeroschin.

In 1291, as the Komtur of Königsberg, Bertold Brühaven organized and fulfilled a successful raid against the Grand Duchy of Lithuania in the region of Junigeda, which is described by Peter of Dusburg and Nikolaus von Jeroschin in their chronicles:

In the year of our Lord 1291 on the Day of our Lady known as Candlemas, Brother Bertold Brühaven, that ever reliable warrior for God, took 1,500 brothers and armed men and set off with them into Lithuania.... [H]e reached the area called Junigeda, which he attacked ferociously, burning and looting it and also killing or taking prisoner approximately 700 heathen men and women.

Later that year, at the head of 1,000 men he raided the same area again to storm the castle of the same name. The storm was repulsed by the Lithuanians, and then Bertold Brühaven changed the direction of the attack: his army stormed and captured the castle of Medraba. As Peter of Dusburg and Nikolaus von Jeroschin report,

[H]e ... went to the castle at Medraba ... and stormed it relentlessly until he captured it from the control of the enemy, killing or taking prisoner everyone he found there. Having achieved this he burned down the castle and returned home.

In 1298, during a rivalry with the Archbishops of Riga for mastery in Livonia, Bertold Brühaven was sent at the head of a large force to assist the Livonian branch of the Order. As Peter of Dusburg and Nikolaus von Jeroschin report,

Grand Master Gottfried von Hohenlohe ... heard what difficulties the arrogant Rigans were inflicting on the brothers, he sent Brühaven with a big force of brothers and armed men to Livonia to help and protect the brothers.... When Brühaven had arrived from Prussia with his army he joined all the Livonians with their arms and together they turned against the people, besieging Neuermühlen on the feast day of the Apostles St Peter and St Paul and beginning a ferocious battle which saved Neuermühlen from further harm and created many widows in the town of Riga.... [T]he brothers hacked at and killed ... more than 4,000 besides those who barely escaped with serious wounds.

Being the Komtur of Königsberg, Bertold Brühaven was wondering if he could to keep the vow of Clerical celibacy he took when he joined the Order. Hence, he decided to test himself. As the abovementioned chronicles both by Peter of Dusburg and Nikolaus von Jeroschin go,

After long consideration, he decided that poverty and obedience were tolerable, but chastity terrified him, because no-one can ever live chastely unless God makes it possible. He decided to find out in advance whether he would be capable of withstanding this way of life; he tried an amazing experiment with temptation. He chose a gentle, well brought-up young girl, whose beauty was unequalled in that region, and he lay naked in bed with her virtually every night. This went on for a full year and yet, as the girl later swore on oath, and as was proved by the physical signs of her virginity, he had not deflowered her or ever treated her immodestly, but had left her as he found her. These events are wonderful and miraculous. God gave Samson great strength, King David holiness, Solomon wisdom, but that was not enough to save them in their day: they were defeated by feminine wiles which made them do evil and laid them low. This brother, however, freely sought out the company of a woman and yet abstained from sinful contact with her. For this reason, if I dared, I would say that he was holier than David, much stronger than Samson and much wiser than Solomon in his conduct and worthy of great praise.

== See also ==
- Prussian Crusade
- Löbenicht
