= Corps Masovia Königsberg zu Potsdam =

Academic fraternity in Potsdam, Germany

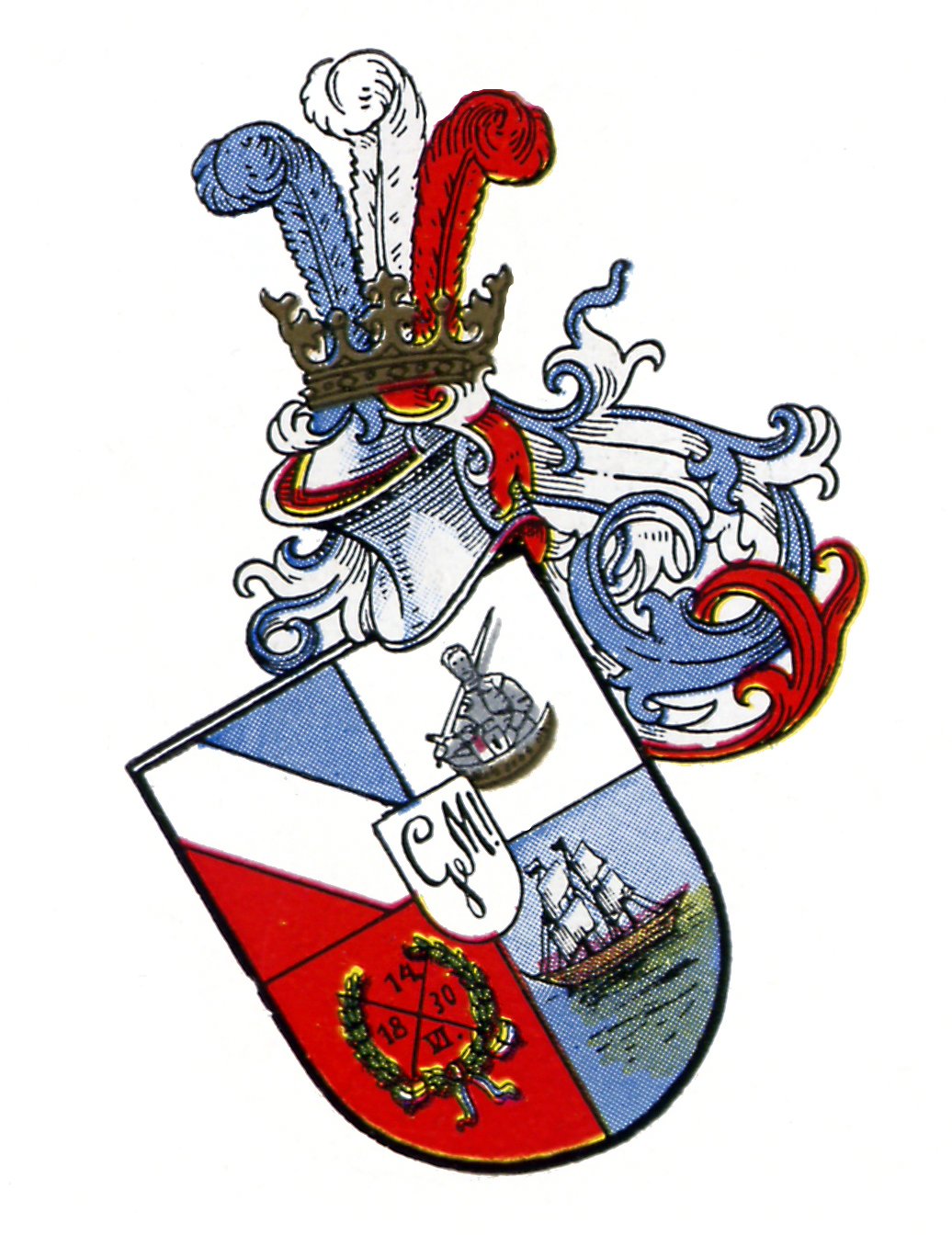
- Founded: June 1830; 196 years ago University of Königsberg
- Type: German Student Corps
- Affiliation: KSCV
- Former affiliation: Corps Palaiomarchia
- Status: Active
- Emphasis: Masovians
- Scope: Local
- Motto: Virtus contemnit mortem!
- Colors: Light Blue, White, Fire Red
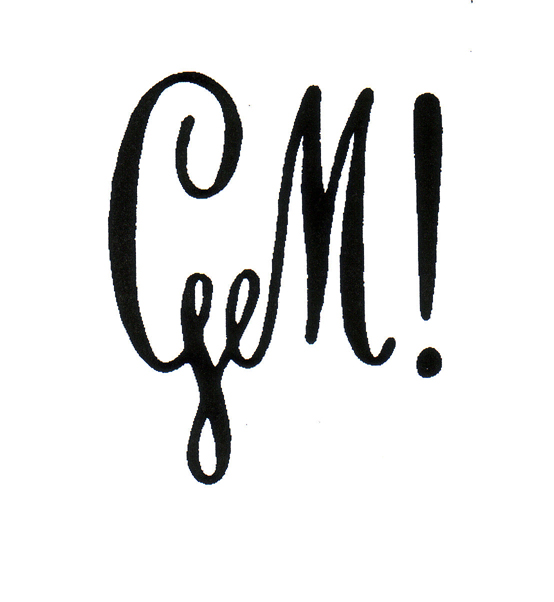
- Zirkel

- Flag
- Chapters: 1
- Headquarters: 17 Kurfürstenstraße; Potsdam, Brandenburg 14467; Germany
- Website: corps-masovia.de

The Corps Masovia Königsberg zu Potsdam (KSCV) is a German academic student corps with an emphasis on the Masovian people. It was established at the University of Königsberg in Königsberg, Germany in 1830 and is the only surviving student corps from that defunct institution. After going dormant under Nazi rule, Corps Masovia was re-established at the University of Potsdam in Potsdam, Germany in 2001.

== History ==
=== Mascovian people ===
The Masovian people represented a distinct minority originally in the Kingdom of Prussia, with a culture that was a unique blend of German and Polish traditions. They were Lutheran protestants, commonly spoke Polish and devoted themselves to the Prussian kings

In the 19th century, most corps members came from and returned to the remote and impoverished area of Masovia in the Kingdom of Prussia. 500 corps members were educated in Lyck and Rastenburg, now in Poland. The Kingdom of Prussia dissolved in 1918. After World War II, the Mascovian peopled declared themselves as Germans. The German-Mascovian protestant pastors, many of them corps members, helped to preserve the Mascovian heritage.

=== Corps Mascovia ===
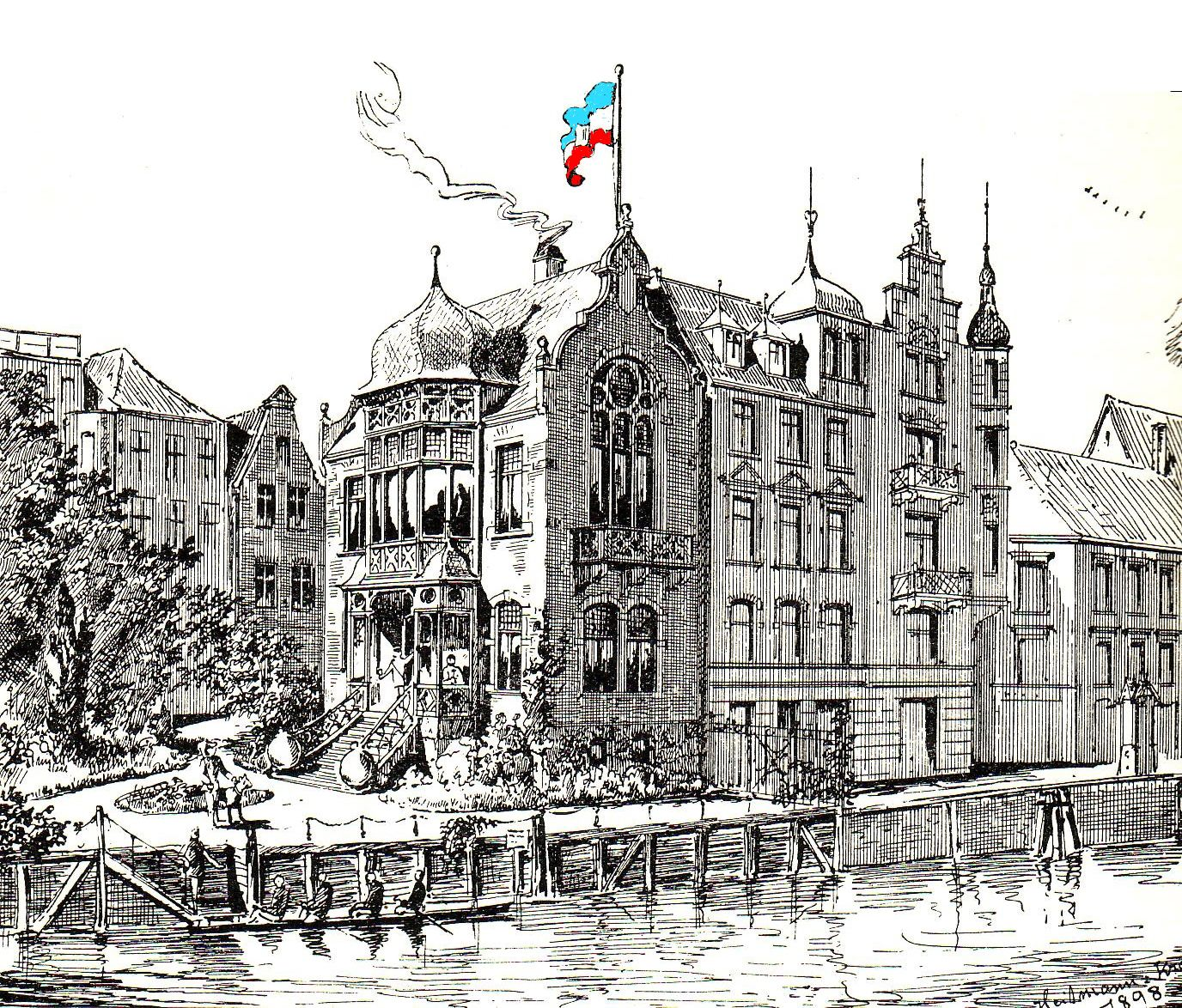
The 1929 illustration depicting the Corps Masovia headquarters in Königsberg.

The Corps Masovia was founded in June 1830 at the University of Königsberg in East Prussia and played an important role at the university for more than 100 years. For its centenary in 1930, the Mazovian mayors donated a library cupboard with the arm coats of their thirty towns. In 1935, Corps Masovia and all other student corps were forced to cease operations by the Nazi regime.

Corps Masovia reactivated after World Wari II. In January 1950, it joined the Corps Palaiomarchia, which had been expelled from Halle (Saale) and restituted in Kiel. When it became evident that this had not been a formal restitution, Corps Masovia Königsberg zu Potsdam re-established itself at the University of Potsdam on January 20, 2001.

In 2001, a group from Masovia visited Königsberg, Russia and thereafter groups of Masovians exchanged visits with students and faculty from Immanuel Kant University; however, contact was broken off in 2010.

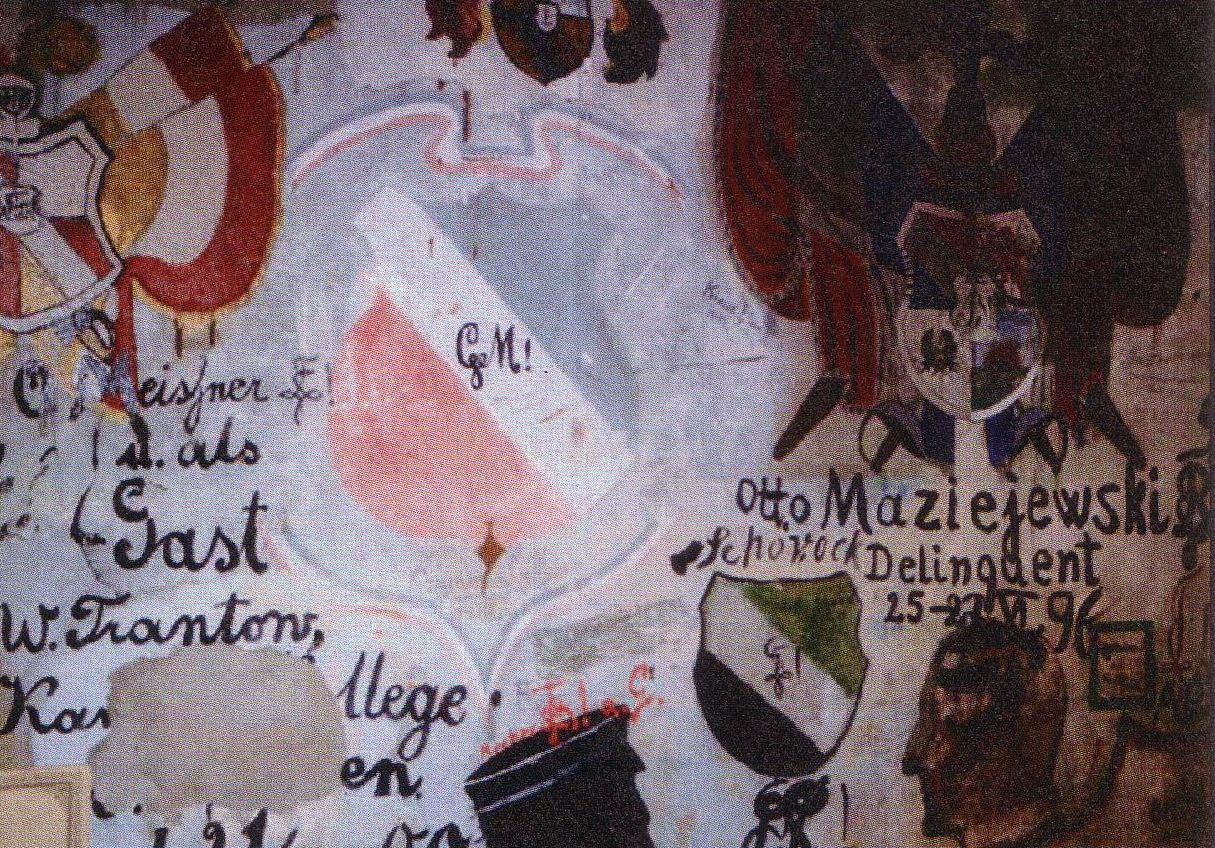
Masovia in Karzer, University of Greifswald (1893)

== Symbols ==
Mascovia's colours are light blue, white, and fire-red. The Mazovian people considered the Corps Masovia as their own and adopted its blue-white-red flag.

In 1855, Friedrich Dewischeit, a Mazovian teacher, composed songs about Masovia. Dedicated to the Corps Masovia, the Masurenlied still is the hymn of the Mazovian people.

== Members ==
In East Prussia, many pastors, teachers, judges, physicians, civil servants, and mayors proudly showed Masovia's colours. Fifteen members of the Prussian Parliament (Abgeordnetenhaus) were corps members, three conservatives and twelve liberals. Two sat in the Prussian House of Lords, four in the Reichstag. Jews and Catholic priests, French and Polish members illustrate Masovia's unconstricted freedom of spirit.

115 corps members fell in both world wars. In World War I, six received the Königliche Hausorden von Hohenzollern (prestage of the Pour le Mérite). In the Second World War, three received the Knight's Cross of the Iron Cross, one with Oak Leaves.

Some of Corps Masovia's notable members include:

- Horst Ademeit, Major, Knight Cross of the Iron Cross with Oak Leaves
- Ludwig Bänfer, jurist
- Gustav Adolf Bergenroth, historian
- Erich Bloedorn, Colonel, Knight Cross of the Iron Cross
- Rüdiger Döhler, Professor of Orthopaedic Surgery
- Gustav Gisevius (1810-1848), pastor in Mazovia
- Ferdinand Gregorovius, historian, honorary citizen of Rome
- Paul Hensel (politician), campaigner for Mazovia
- Jürgen Herrlein, lawyer
- Otto Hesse. Professor of Mathematics in Heidelberg
- Goetz Oertel, physicist, member of National Academy of Sciences
- Hans Pfundtner (1881–1945), German lawyer and State Secretary in the Interior Ministry of Nazi Germany
- Friedrich Julius Richelot, Professor of Mathematics in Königsberg
- Arthur Zimmermann (1864–1940), State Secretary of Foreign Affairs (Foreign Minister) in the German Empire

== See also ==
- Masurians
- Mazovia
