= Sackheim Gate =

City gate in Kaliningrad, Russia

Coordinates: 54°42′34.30″N 20°32′16.30″E

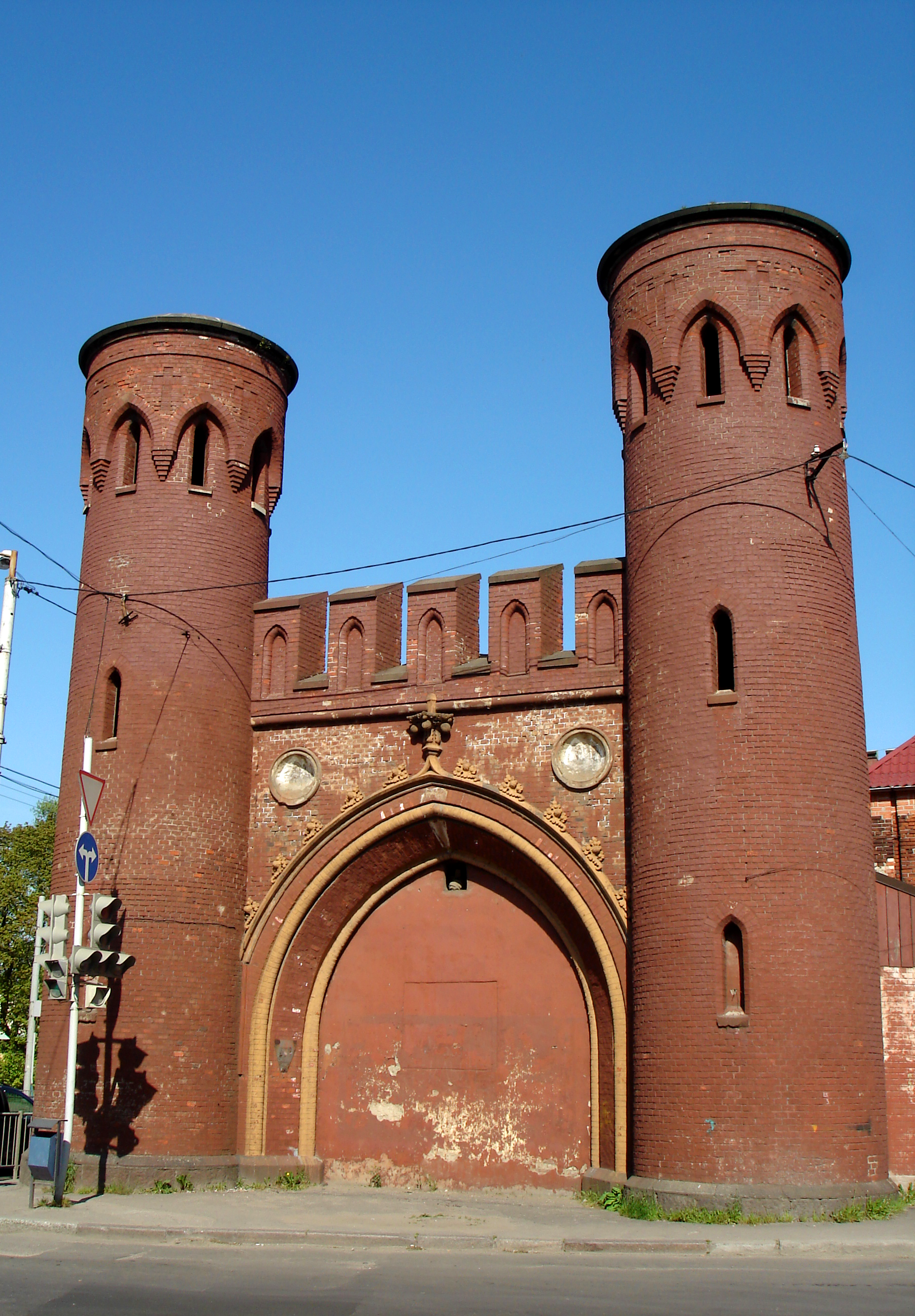
The Sackheim Gate in 2008.

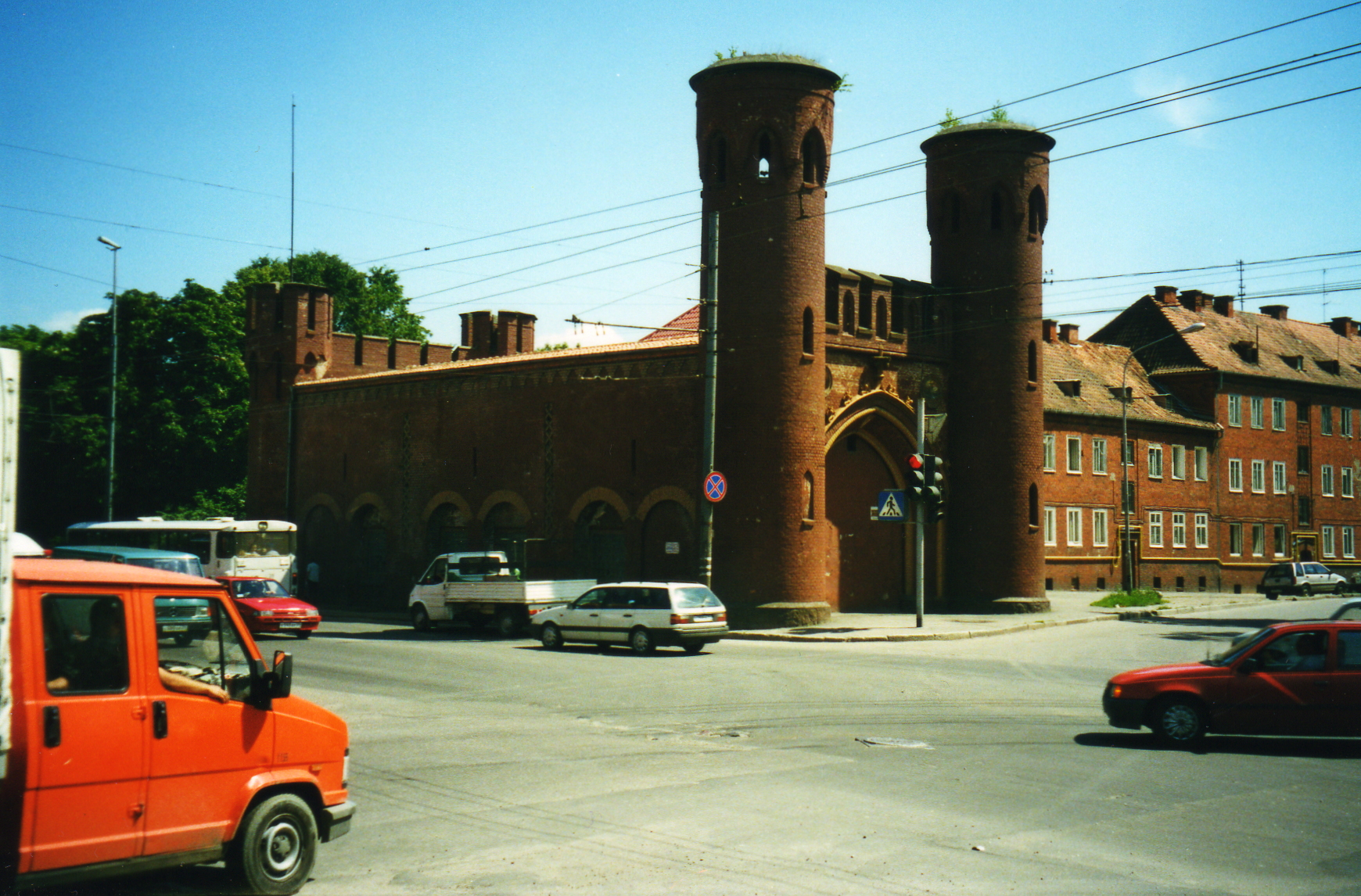
The Sackheim Gate in 2002.

The Sackheim Gate (Russian: Закхаймские ворота, tr.: Zakkhaymskie vorota; German: Sackheimer Tor) is one of seven surviving city gates in Kaliningrad, Russia, formerly the German city of Königsberg. It is located at the intersection of Moscow avenue and Lithuanian wall street.

== History ==
Named after the Sackheim district, the current gate was built in the middle of the 19th century. It replaced an earlier version which was erected during the construction of the first city walls of Königsberg at the beginning of 17th century. After World War II, the gate was used as a warehouse, which it remained until 2006. The gate is protected as a monument by the Russian federal government.

In 2006, restoration of the gate began. After restoration will be completed, the gate will be used by the Centre of Standardisation and Metrology, a Russian federal government agency. It will accommodate laboratories and a small museum, where weights and other antique measuring instruments will be on display.

== Architecture ==
The Sackheim Gate has one passageway with arches at both ends of the gate. In the past each side also had smaller arches, which may have been pedestrian passageways, but these have since been torn down. At the corners there are four towers: two round ones on the city side and two octagonal ones on the outer side. The city side of the gate is decorated with reliefs of Ludwig Yorck von Wartenburg and Friedrich Wilhelm von Bülow. The other side of the gate has the image of a black eagle, reminiscing the Order of the Black Eagle, which was the highest award of Prussia.
