= Sackheim =

Coordinates: 54.7105°N 20.5310°E

Sackheim was a quarter of eastern Königsberg, Germany. Its territory is now part of the Leningradsky District of Kaliningrad, Russia.

== History ==
Although it was documented in 1326, Sackheim already existed as an Old Prussian farming village when the Teutonic Knights conquered Sambia in 1255 during the Prussian Crusade. The German name Sackheim was derived from the Prussian Sakkeim, meaning a village in cleared woodland. It was bordered by Löbenicht to the west, Neue Sorge to the north, Sackheim Gate and the early 17th century city walls to the east, and the Pregel River to the south. Beyond the walls was the road to Liep.

Few Germans lived in Sackheim during the Middle Ages; raftsmen from the Grand Duchy of Lithuania often stayed in the quarter, and much of Königsberg's Prussian Lithuanian population lived in Sackheim. It received a court seal and was made a Freiheit, or suburb subordinated to Königsberg Castle, in 1578. Sackheim's escutcheon depicted the Lamb of God with red standard on a green field.

Sackheim endured fires in 1513, 1539, and 1575. It was especially damaged by a citywide conflagration on 11 November 1764. Altstadt, Löbenicht, Kneiphof, and their respective suburbs were merged to form the united city of Königsberg in 1724. However, Königsberg Castle and its suburbs, including Sackheim, were included within the new city limits but remained under royal, not municipal, control. Sackheim was merged into the city during the Städteordnung of Stein on 19 November 1808 during the era of Prussian reforms.

Working-class Sackheim had one of the highest birth rates in the city at the start of the 20th century. Sackheim was heavily damaged by the 1944 Bombing of Königsberg and 1945 Battle of Königsberg.

== Locations ==
Names for Sackheim's main thoroughfare included Sackheimerstraße, Sackheimer rechte Straße, and after World War I simply Sackheim. Gebauhrstraße (formerly Sackheimer Hinterstraße), named after the manufacturer Carl J. Gebauhr, ran through southern Sackheim. Yorckstraße (formerly the Alte Reiferbahn), named after Field Marshal Ludwig Yorck von Wartenburg, was located in northern Sackheim.

Churches in Sackheim included the Sackheim Church for German Lutherans, St. Elisabeth's Church for Lithuanian Lutherans, and the Propsteikirche for Catholics.

The Königliches Waisenhaus, or Royal Orphanage, was designed by Joachim Ludwig Schultheiß von Unfried near Sackheim Gate. Founded by King Frederick I in 1701 and dedicated in 1703, it was maintained by the Order of the Black Eagle. Its Reformed church, the Waisenhauskirche, was used from 1705 to 1809. The Lazarett, a military hospital, opened on Yorckstraße in 1880. The city's eastern fire department was also located on Yorckstraße.

The Ostpreußische Generallandschaftsdirektion, an institution which offered agricultural loans, was located on Landhofmeisterstraße by the border with the Anger district of Löbenicht since 1806. On 5 February 1813 after the Convention of Tauroggen, the East Prussian estates met there with Count Dohna and Yorck to discuss the raising of troops for the War of the Sixth Coalition. They unanimously agreed to the raising of a reserve corps of 10,000 troops, a Landwehr of 20,000 troops, a Landsturm for local defense, and a volunteer cavalry regiment.

The Litauer Baum was a barricade of chained tree branches located at the entrance of the Pregel into the city, near the Litauer Wallgasse and the medieval city walls. Used to enforce tolls on ships arriving from the east (from the direction of the Grand Duchy of Lithuania), the Litauer Baum was built in 1636. The Höllander Baum near Lizent in western Königsberg was a similar barricade.

Near Sackheim Gate was the Kupferteich (copper pond), an artificial dam with a copper forge mill. In 1925 it was converted into a swimming pool.

== Reputation ==
Sackheim had a poor reputation compared to Altstadt, Löbenicht, and Kneiphof, the three towns of medieval Königsberg. A popular verse was as follows:

In der Altstadt die Macht
im Kneiphof die Pracht
im Löbenicht der Acker
auf dem Sackheim der Racker.

In Altstadt the power
in Kneiphof the pomp
in Löbenicht the fields
in Sackheim the knacker.

Racker referred to the knackers and executioners of Sackheim employed by Löbenicht.

== Gallery ==
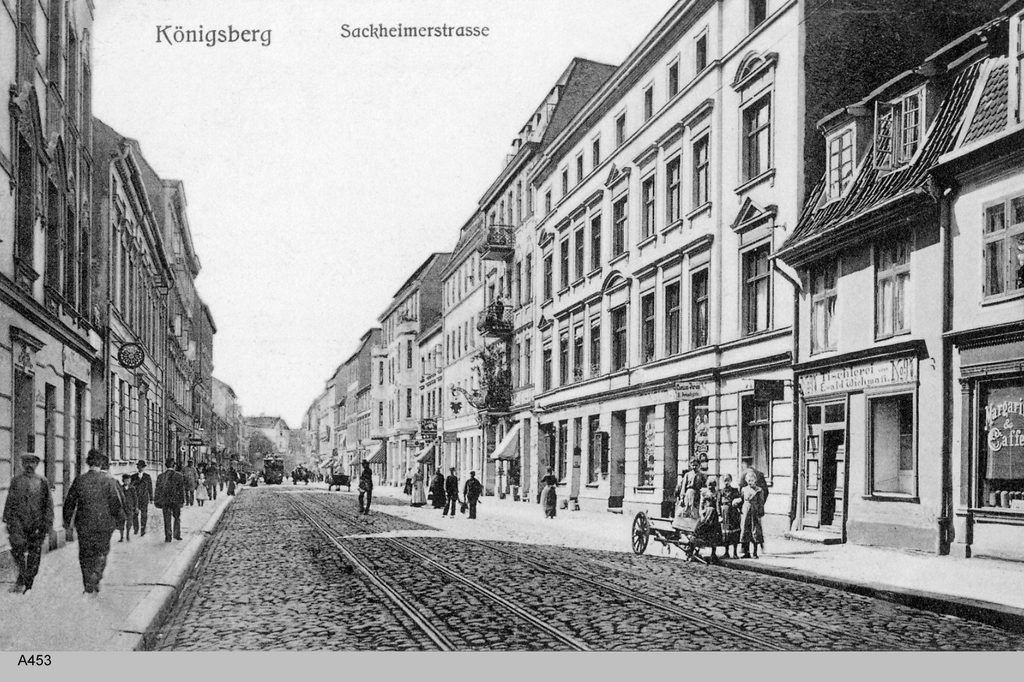
Sackheimer Straße

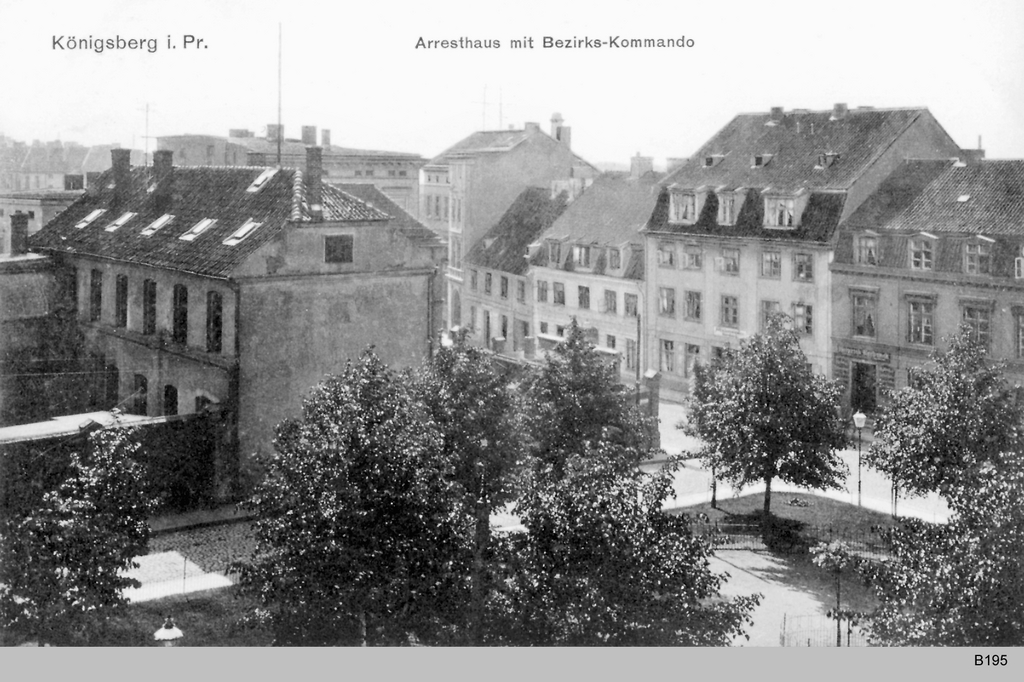
Arresthausplatz

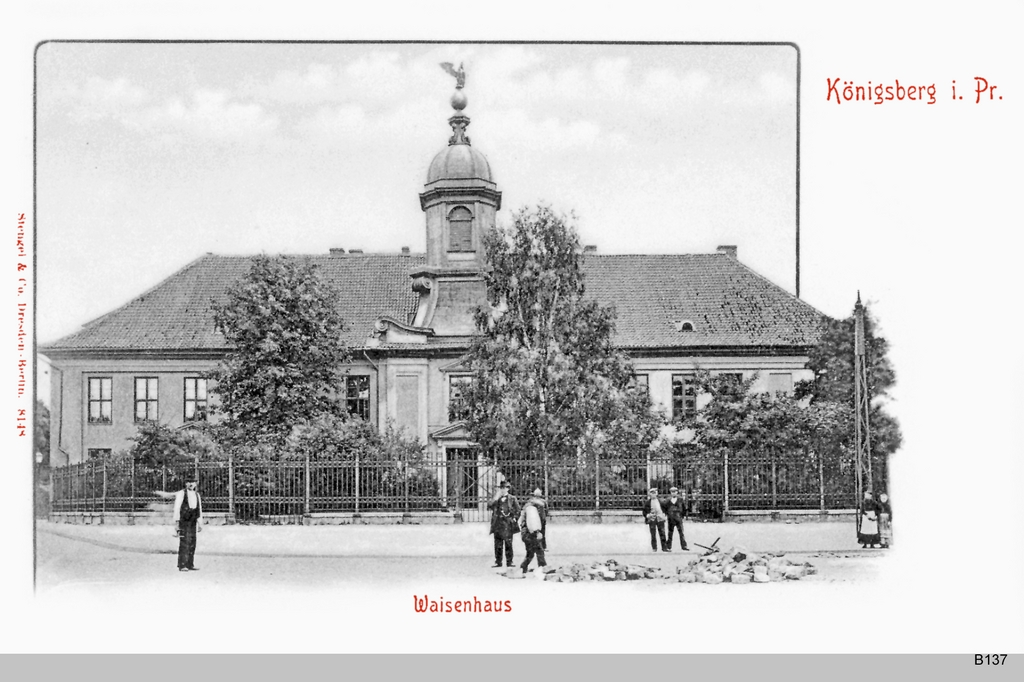
Königliches Waisenhaus

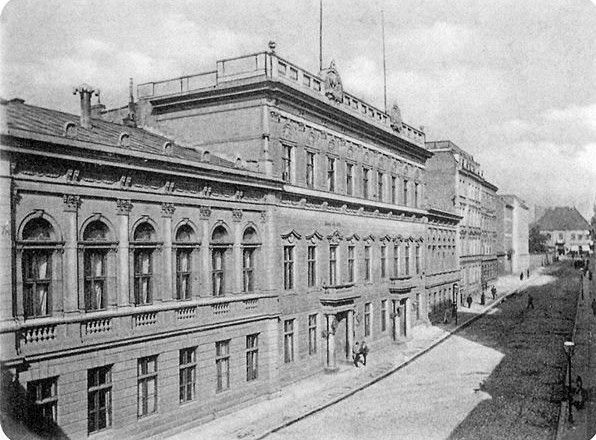
Generallandschaftsdirektion
