= St. Elisabeth's Church, Königsberg =

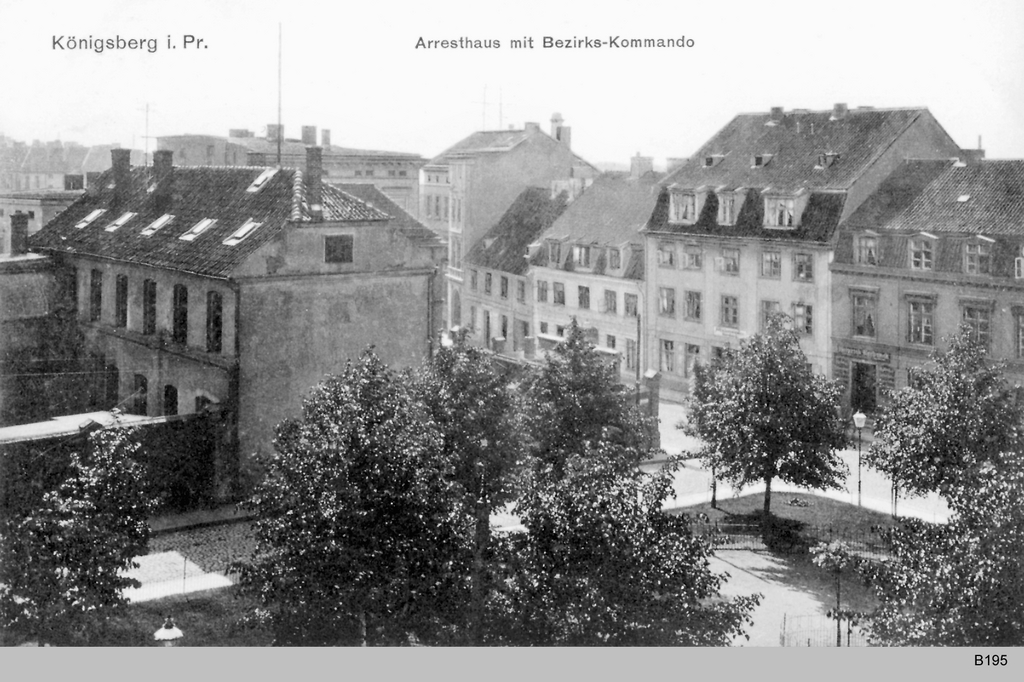
Arresthausplatz, site of the former church

St. Elisabeth's Church (German: Elisabethkirche) or Lithuanian Church (Litauische Kirche) was a church in the Sackheim quarter of Königsberg, Germany.

== History ==
St. Elisabeth's was first documented in 1420 as the chapel of Sackheim's Saint Elizabeth Hospital, administered by a Catholic convent. The Duchy of Prussia was established in 1525 during the Protestant Reformation, and it is unknown what the building was used for during the remainder of the 16th century.

After the Reformation, Königsberg's Lutheran Polish- and Lithuanian-speaking communities attended St. Nicholas' Church in Steindamm. Disputes between the two groups were common, however, and once the Jesuits began to express interest, the Lutheran Königsberg Consistory granted St. Elisabeth's to parishioners of Lithuanian native language as their own church in 1603. The first Lithuanian-speaking pastor at the church was Lazarus Sengstock (1562-1621), a native of Lübeck who learned the language in Memel. Sengstock was succeeded by Johannes Rhesa (1576-1629). Most attendees of the church were laborers, domestic workers, and beggars. Unlike the other churches of Königsberg, St. Elisabeth's was too poor to have its own school.

St. Elisabeth's was converted into a prison (Arresthaus) in 1807 when the number of attendees dwindled. By 1896 it was used as an administrative building of the Prussian Army and during the Weimar era it was a library for Wehrkreis I. In 1933 the nearby square, Arresthausplatz, was renamed Elisabeth-Platz. The former church finally served as a pension office before the destruction of Königsberg during World War II.
