= Löbenicht Church =

Coordinates: 54°42′35″N 20°31′02″E

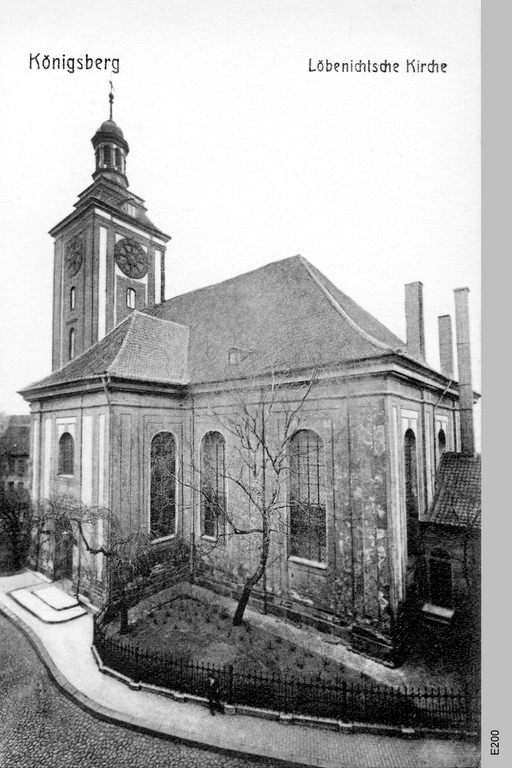
Löbenicht Church in 1908

Löbenicht Church (German: Löbenichtsche Kirche, Polish: Kościół lipnicki) was a church, initially Catholic and then Protestant, in the Löbenicht quarter of Königsberg (modern Kaliningrad, Russia).

== History ==
Originally a Roman Catholic church known as "St. Barbara auf dem Berge", the church was built from 1334 to 1352 and then expanded in 1474. The top of its steeple was destroyed in a storm in 1497 and was rebuilt with four turrets. It was converted to Lutheranism after the 1525 establishment of the Duchy of Prussia. In 1608 Pastor Christoph Mirau wrote his Lobspruch der Stadt Königsberg. Polish church services were held in the church from 1618 to 1817.

After a lightning strike destroyed the church's steeple in 1695, it was rebuilt in 1702 with a gallery and four turrets. Seven people died after the church's vault collapsed in 1717. The church was destroyed during the great fire of Löbenicht on 11 November 1764. The fire caused the steeple church to fall upon Löbenicht's school, setting it ablaze. Johann Ernst Löckel led the church's reconstruction, which was completed in 1776. In 1818 a storm damaged the flag and adornment atop the bell tower.

The church was decorated with bright colors in the Rococo style. Its combined pulpit/altar (Kanzelaltar) was carved by Friedrich Suhse in 1776. The organ was built by Johann Preuss (1722–90) in 1782 and was decorated with Rococo carvings, music-playing angels, and the crowned Prussian eagle.

The church was heavily damaged by the 1944 Bombing of Königsberg and was not rebuilt by the Soviet Union after the 1945 Battle of Königsberg. Pastor Link managed to bring a 1681 silver book cover from the church's collection with him to Hamburg in 1948. The church's remnants were demolished by the Soviet administration in Kaliningrad, Russia, in 1970.

== Gallery ==
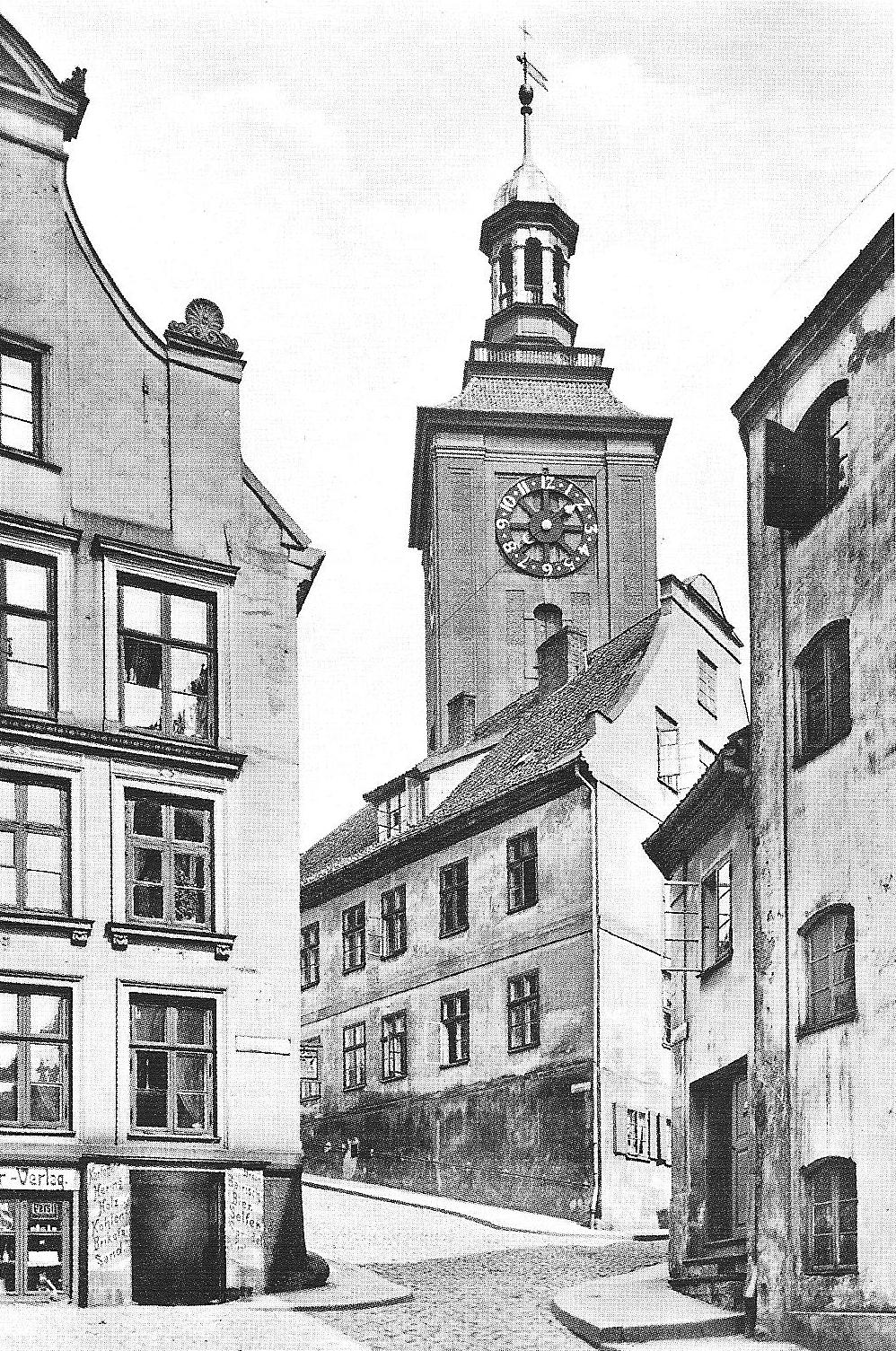
Postcard of the church

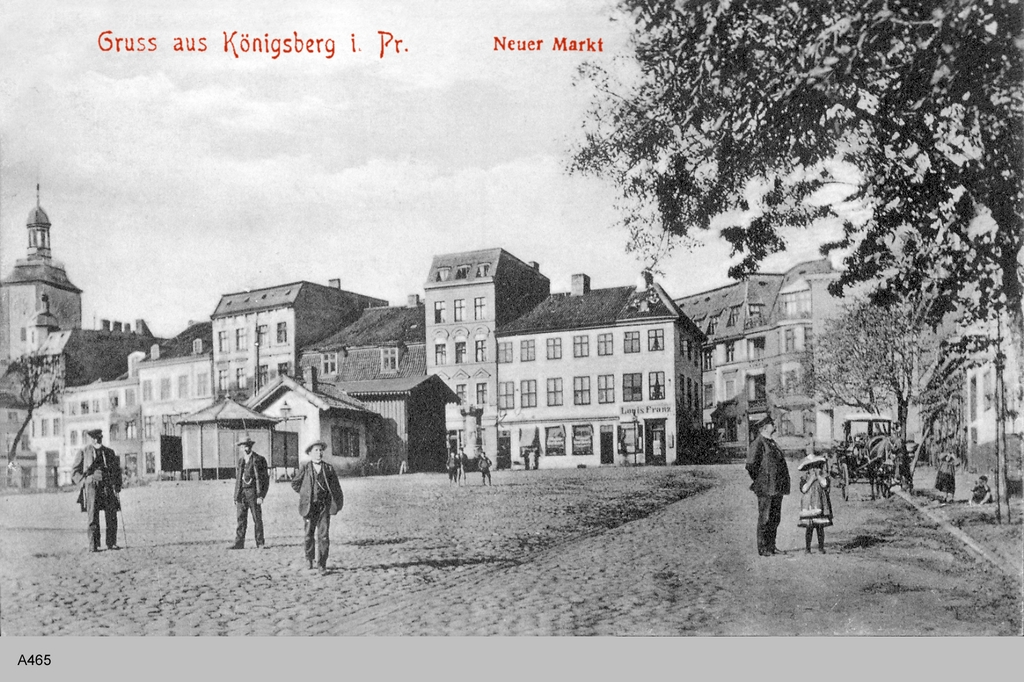
View of the church from the Neuer Markt

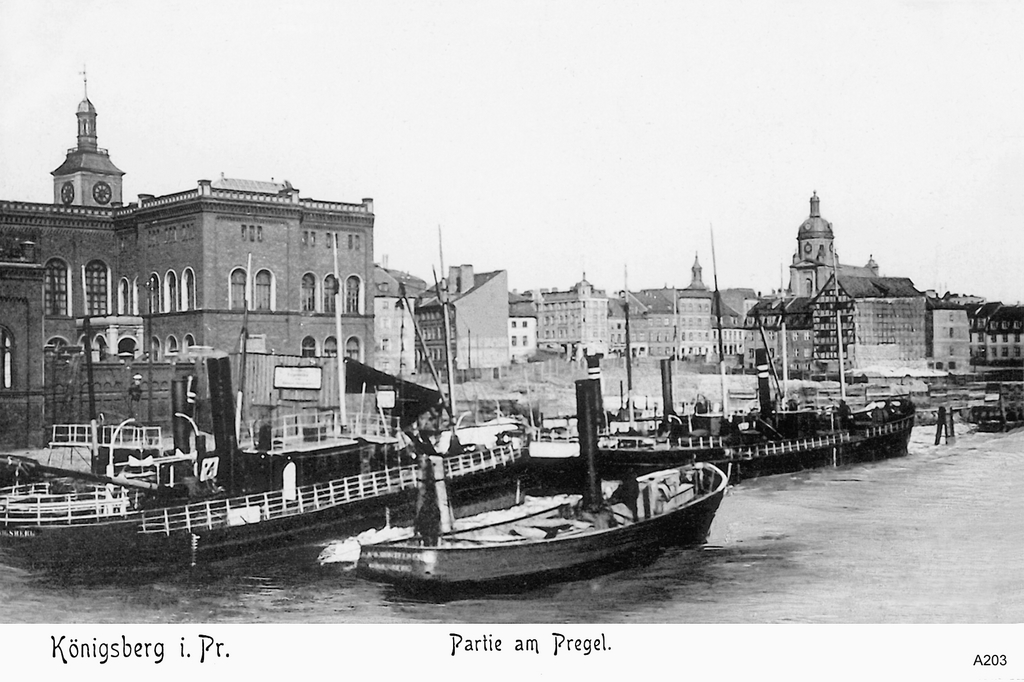
View from the Pregel, including the church, gymnasium, and Propsteikirche
