= Propsteikirche, Königsberg =

Church building in Konigsberg, Germany

Coordinates: 54°42′33″N 20°31′17″E

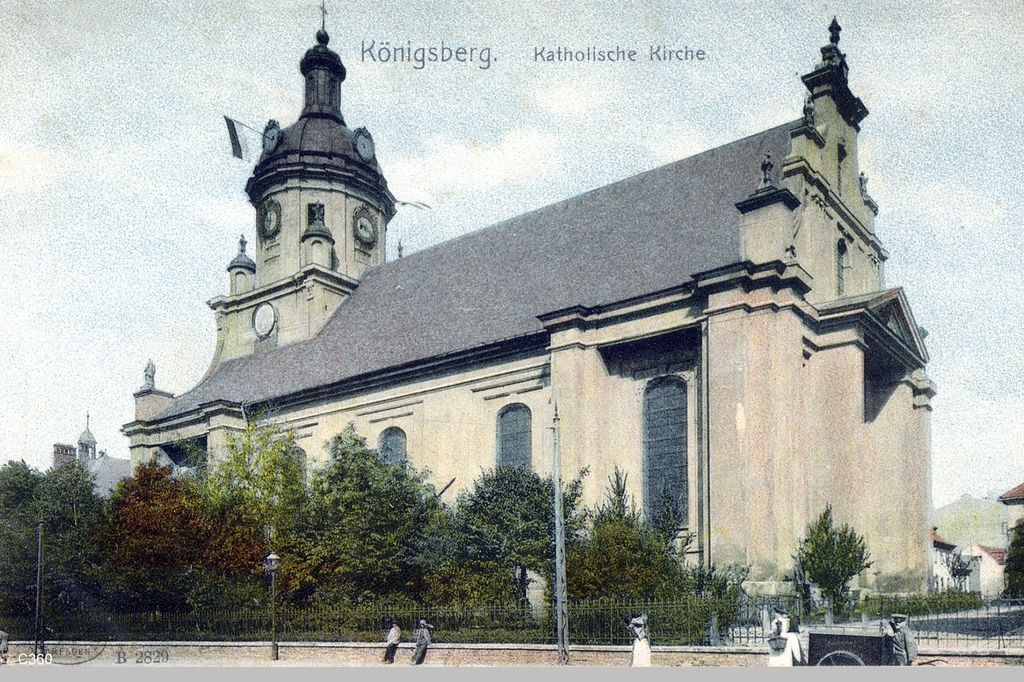
Propsteikirche, c. 1908

The Propsteikirche (German for "provost church"), also known as the Katholische Kirche (Catholic church), was a Roman Catholic church in the Sackheim quarter of Königsberg, Germany. Its patron saint was John the Baptist.

== History ==
As part of his investiture as Duke of Prussia in Warsaw in 1611, Elector John Sigismund agreed to the building of two churches for Catholics in mostly Protestant Königsberg. Ultimately, only one was successfully built. Construction began immediately in 1612 in the Sackheim district, on land belonging to the Königsberg Castle, which before the Reformation had been part of the Samland diocese. The church was built in the years 1614–1616, its architect was Nicholaus Rambas.

The envoys of the Warmian bishop Szymon Rudnicki brought a cornerstone to Königsberg, upon which the bishop had a Latin inscription engraved:

To God, the Best and Greatest. In honor of Almighty God, the Blessed Virgin Mary, and all the saints, as well as the patrons of the Warmian Church—Saint Andrew the Apostle, Saint John the Baptist, and Saint Adalbert, Bishop and Martyr—the Most Reverend and Honorable Bishop of Warmia, Lord Szymon Rudnicki, the ordinary of this diocese, placed this very cornerstone, consecrated according to the rite of the Holy Roman Catholic Church, into the foundations on the 22nd day of May, 1614.

The church was served by a parish priest and two vicars, with the Prince of Prussia acting as the parish's patron. The parish priest was required to know three languages: Polish, German, and Lithuanian. If the priest did not speak one of these languages, he had to employ a vicar who did. Most often, parish priests were fluent in Polish and German.

The church burned down during the great fire of 11 November 1764. It was rebuilt from 1765 to 1776 under the direction of Johann Samuel Lilienthal, who also constructed the chaplain's Kaplanei northwest of the church from 1770 to 1772. The rebuilt Baroque church was consecrated in 1777.

In 1810, Max von Schenkendorf led an obsequy for the popular Queen Louise at the Propsteikirche with music by Johann Friedrich Reichardt. The church was taken over by the Old Catholics in 1876. In 1868, Julius Dinder was appointed provost of Königsberg in Prussia, and by 1889 the church had been reverted to the Holy See. In 1886, Dinder became Archbishop of Gniezno (Gnesen-Posen).

The church was heavily damaged by the 1944 Bombing of Königsberg and the 1945 Battle of Königsberg. The Soviet administration in Kaliningrad demolished the remnants in the 1960s.

== Gallery ==
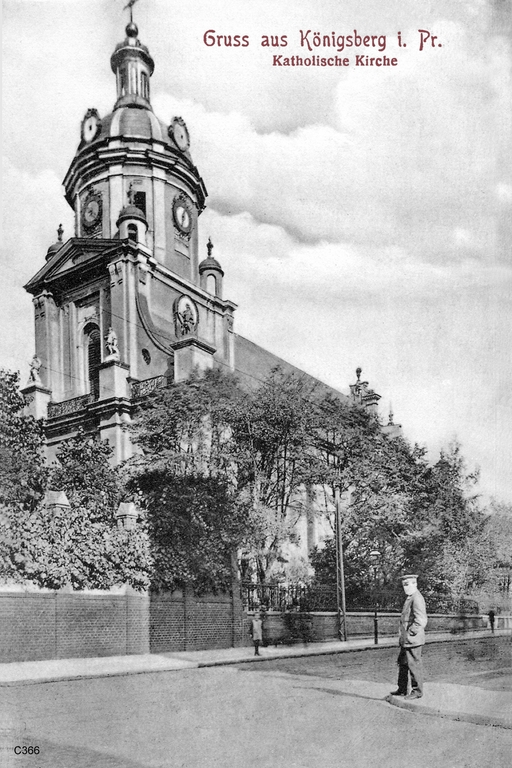
Propsteikirche

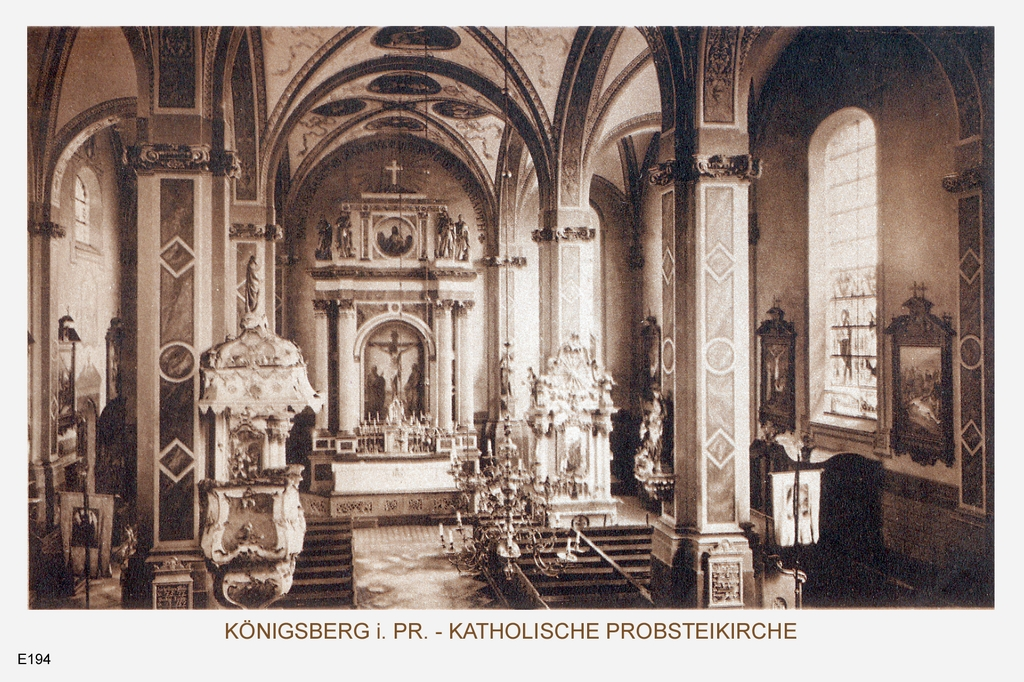
Interior of the Propsteikirche
