= Rizhskoye =

Coordinates: 54.7230°N 20.5480°E

Rizhskoye (Russian: Рижское) is part of the Leningradsky District in northern Kaliningrad, Russia. It was formerly known by its German language name Kalthof as first a suburb of and then a quarter of Königsberg, Germany.

== History ==
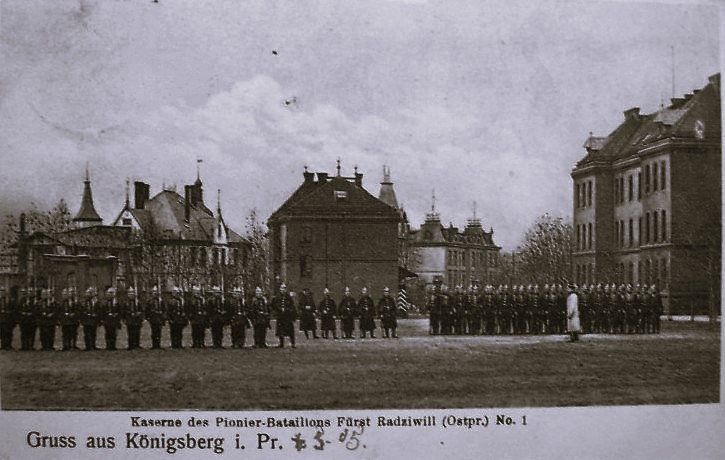
Barracks of the Pionier-Bataillon Fürst Radziwill (Ostpreußisches) Nr. 1

Kalthof was founded by the Teutonic Knights as an outwork (Vorwerk) estate on the eastern approach to medieval Königsberg. Its farmland extended as far west as Rossgarten's marketplace, the Roßgärter Markt; the farmland was gradually developed by Rossgarten and Neue Sorge over centuries. A copper mill was located nearby in 1416. The estate was worked by farmers from nearby villages. In the late 17th century Kalthof, Lawsken, and Spittelhof were possessed by Johann von Hille, commandant of Fort Friedrichsburg.

The 1,100 morgen Devau Revuefeld just east of Kalthof was the oldest large training ground of the Prussian Army, with exercises held annually since 1717. King Frederick the Great did not want any ceremonies during his first visit to Königsberg after his accession. Instead, a large revue of East Prussia's troops was held on 20 April 1740 instead. In 1893 Kalthof contained barracks for two pioneer battalions of the Prussian I Corps, the Pionier-Bataillon Fürst Radziwill (Ostpreußisches) Nr. 1, formerly of Danzig, and the Samländisches Pionier-Bataillon Nr. 18, which recruited from Samland.

In 1905 the estate's final owner, Berthold Kleist (1848–1932), sold Kalthof to Königsberg, allowing it to be incorporated into the city. At that time it had a population of 2,020. Kalthof was connected to central Königsberg by the street Labiauer Straße (formerly Königsallee), which met Königstraße at King's Gate. Between Kalthof and the Königsberg fortifications were several cemeteries laid out during the 19th century. To the northwest was the Pferderennbahn, or horse racing track, in Carolinenhof. The Devau airfield was northeast of Kalthof. Farther east was Lauth, while Liep was to the southeast.

Within Kalthof was the Kalthöfer Park or Kleist-Park, named after Berthold Kleist. The park contained a stone inscribed with "Non omnis moriar" by Horace. The quarter also contained the Ostdeutsche Brotfabrik, a bread factory, and the Terletzki/Goebels organ company. The parish church was Kalthof Church.

Königsberg was transferred to Soviet control in 1945 after World War II. Königsberg was subsequently renamed to Kaliningrad and Kalthof to Rizhskoye.
