= Frederick III, German Emperor =

German Emperor in 1888

Frederick III
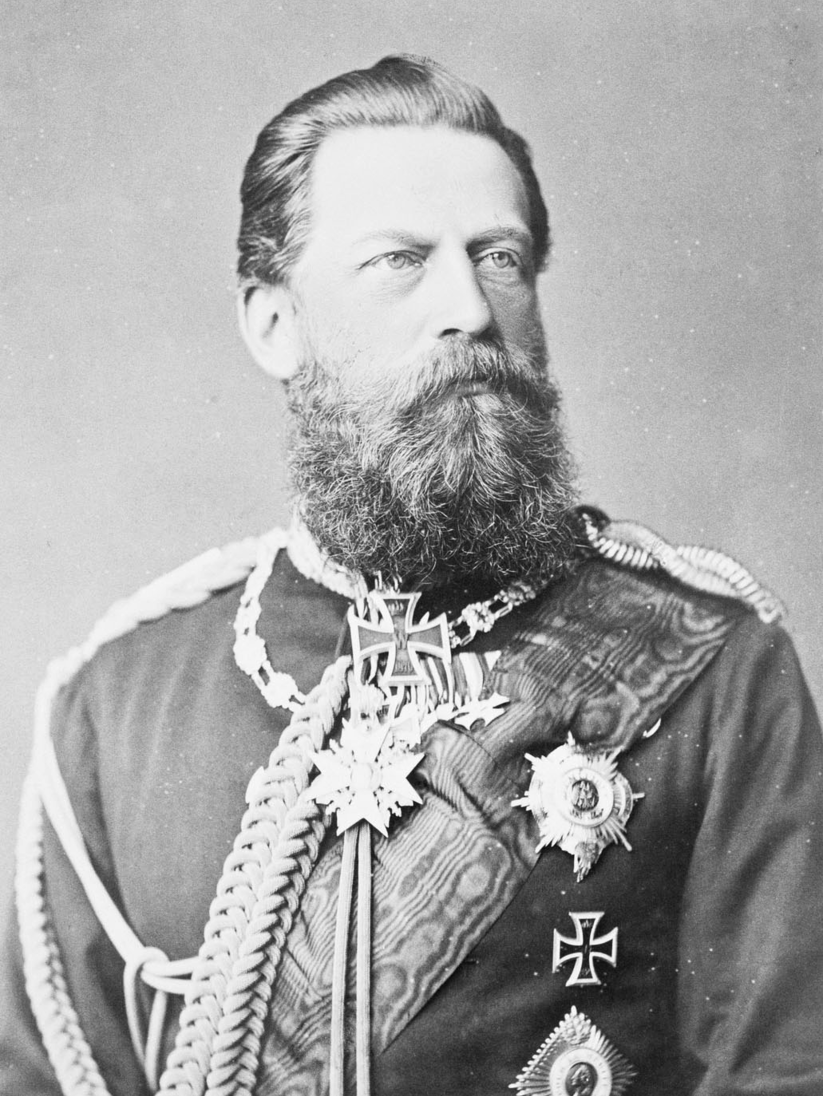
- Frederick as Crown Prince, 1878

German Emperor King of Prussia
- Reign: 9 March – 15 June 1888
- Predecessor: Wilhelm I
- Successor: Wilhelm II
- Chancellor: Otto von Bismarck
- Born: Prince Frederick William of Prussia; 18 October 1831; New Palace, Potsdam, Prussia
- Died: 15 June 1888 (aged 56); New Palace, Potsdam, Germany
- Burial: 18 June 1888; Kaiser Friedrich Mausoleum, Friedenskirche, Potsdam
- Spouse: Victoria, Princess Royal (m. 1858)
- Issue: Wilhelm II, German Emperor; Charlotte, Duchess of Saxe-Meiningen; Prince Henry; Prince Sigismund; Viktoria, Princess Adolf of Schaumburg-Lippe; Prince Waldemar; Sophia, Queen of the Hellenes; Margaret, Landgravine of Hesse
Names
- German: Friedrich Wilhelm Nikolaus Karl; English: Frederick William Nicholas Charles
- House: Hohenzollern
- Father: Wilhelm I, German Emperor
- Mother: Augusta of Saxe-Weimar-Eisenach

Frederick III (Friedrich Wilhelm Nikolaus Karl; 18 October 1831 – 15 June 1888), or Friedrich III, was German Emperor and King of Prussia for 99 days from 9 March 1888 until his death in June that year, during the Year of the Three Emperors.

Known informally as "Fritz", he was the only son of Emperor Wilhelm I and was raised in his family's tradition of military service. Following the unification of Germany in 1871 his father, then King of Prussia, became German Emperor. Upon Wilhelm's death at the age of ninety on 9 March 1888, the thrones passed to Frederick, who had been German Crown Prince for seventeen years and Crown Prince of Prussia for twenty-seven years. Frederick was suffering from cancer of the larynx when he died at the age of 56, following unsuccessful medical treatments for his condition.

Frederick married Victoria, Princess Royal, the oldest child of Queen Victoria of the United Kingdom. The couple were well-matched; their shared liberal ideology led them to support progressive and democratic reform. Despite his family's conservative and militaristic background, Frederick had developed liberal tendencies as a result of his ties with Britain and his studies at the University of Bonn. As crown prince, he often opposed the conservative Chancellor Otto von Bismarck, particularly in speaking out against Bismarck's policy of uniting Germany through force, and in urging that the power of the executive be curbed to the benefit of the Reichstag. Liberals in both Germany and Great Britain hoped that as emperor, Frederick would move to institute democratic reforms in the German Empire.

Frederick and Victoria were great admirers of Prince Albert, Queen Victoria's husband. They planned to rule as joint monarchs and to reform what they saw as flaws in the government. Fredrick planned to institute responsible government, transforming the Empire into a liberal constitutional monarchy inspired by Britain, with ministers bound to the instructions of the Reichstag, rather than the Emperor. However, Frederick's illness prevented him from effectively establishing policies and measures to achieve this, and such moves as he was able to make were later abandoned by his son and successor, Wilhelm II. The timing of Frederick's death and the brevity of his reign are important topics among historians. His premature demise is considered a potential turning point in German history; whether or not he would have made the Empire more liberal if he had lived longer is still a popular discussion among historians.

== Personal life ==
=== Early life and education ===
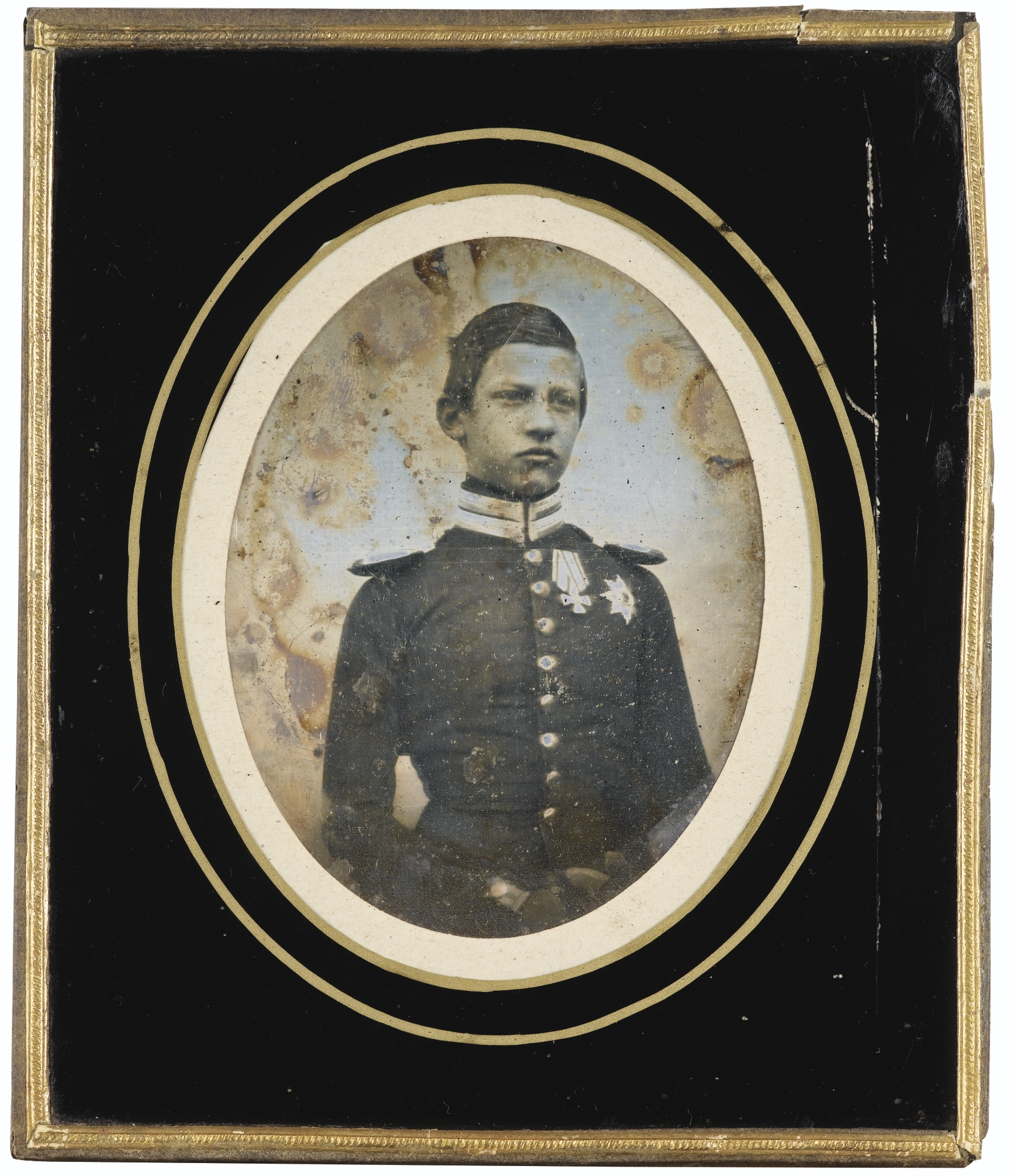
Daguerreotype of Frederick William, c. 1841

Frederick William was born in the New Palace at Potsdam in Prussia on 18 October 1831. He was a scion of the House of Hohenzollern, rulers of Prussia, then the most powerful of the German states. Frederick's father, Prince Wilhelm, was the second son of King Frederick Wilhelm III and, having been raised in the military traditions of the Hohenzollerns, developed into a strict disciplinarian. William fell in love with his cousin Elisa Radziwill, a princess of the Polish nobility, but the court felt Elisa's rank was not suitable for the bride of a Prussian prince and forced a more suitable match. The woman selected to be his wife, Princess Augusta of Saxe-Weimar, had been raised in the more intellectual and artistic atmosphere of Weimar, which gave its citizens greater participation in politics and limited the powers of its rulers through a constitution; Augusta was well known across Europe for her liberal views. Because of their differences, the couple did not have a happy marriage and, as a result, Frederick grew up in a troubled household, which left him with memories of a lonely childhood. He had one sister, Louise (later Grand Duchess of Baden), who was six years his junior and very close to him. Frederick also had a very good relationship with his uncle, the future King Frederick William IV, who has been called "the romantic on the throne".

Known informally as "Fritz", Frederick grew up during a tumultuous political period as the concept of liberalism in Germany, which evolved during the 1840s, was gaining widespread and enthusiastic support. The liberals sought a unified Germany and were constitutional monarchists who desired a constitution to ensure equal protection under the law, the protection of property, and the safeguarding of basic civil rights. Overall, the liberals desired a government ruled by popular representation. When Frederick was 17, these emergent nationalistic and liberal sentiments sparked a series of political uprisings across the German states and elsewhere in Europe. In Germany, their goal was to protect freedoms, such as the freedom of assembly and freedom of the press, and to create a German parliament and constitution. Although the uprisings ultimately brought about no lasting changes, liberal sentiments remained an influential force in German politics throughout Frederick's life.

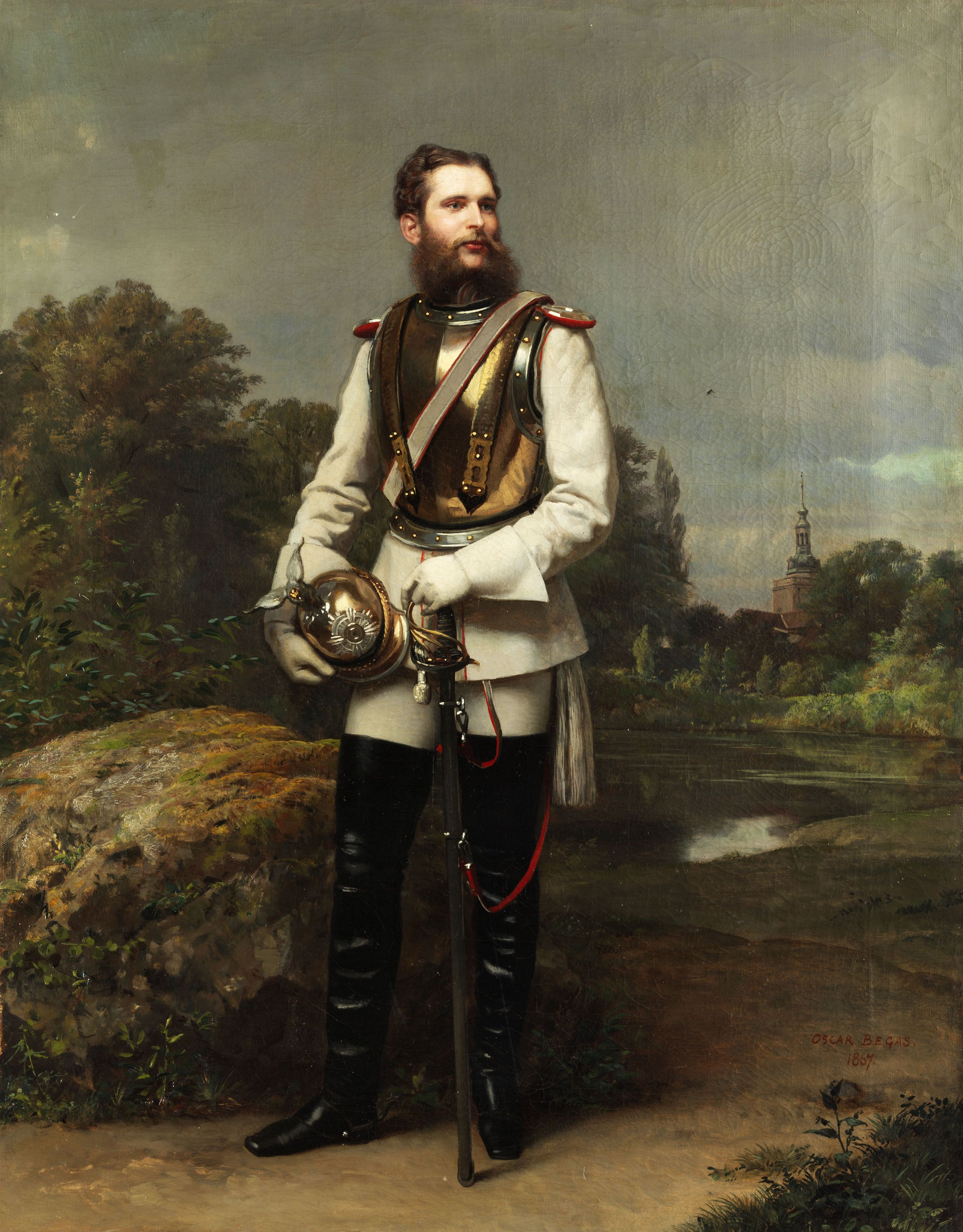
Crown Prince Frederick William of Prussia, 1867, by Oskar Begas

Despite the value placed by the Hohenzollern family on a traditional military education, Augusta insisted that her son also receive a classical education. Accordingly, Frederick was thoroughly tutored in both military traditions and the liberal arts. His private tutor was Ernst Curtius, a famous archaeologist. Frederick was a talented student, particularly good at foreign languages, becoming fluent in English and French, and studying Latin. He also studied history, geography, physics, music and religion, and excelled at gymnastics; as required of a Prussian prince, he became a very good rider. Hohenzollern princes were made familiar with the military traditions of their dynasty at an early age; Frederick was ten when he was commissioned as a second lieutenant into the First Guard Infantry Regiment of Foot. As he grew older, he was expected to maintain an active involvement in military affairs. However, at the age of 18, he broke with family tradition and entered the University of Bonn where he studied history, law and governance, and public policy. During his time at Bonn (1850–1852), his teachers included Ernst Moritz Arndt and Friedrich Christoph Dahlmann. His time spent at the university, coupled with the influence of less conservative family members, were instrumental in his embrace of liberal beliefs.

In 1853, Frederick was initiated into Freemasonry by his father, then Prince William of Prussia, and would later become Master of the Order of the Grand Landlodge of the Freemasons of Germany.

=== Marriage and family ===
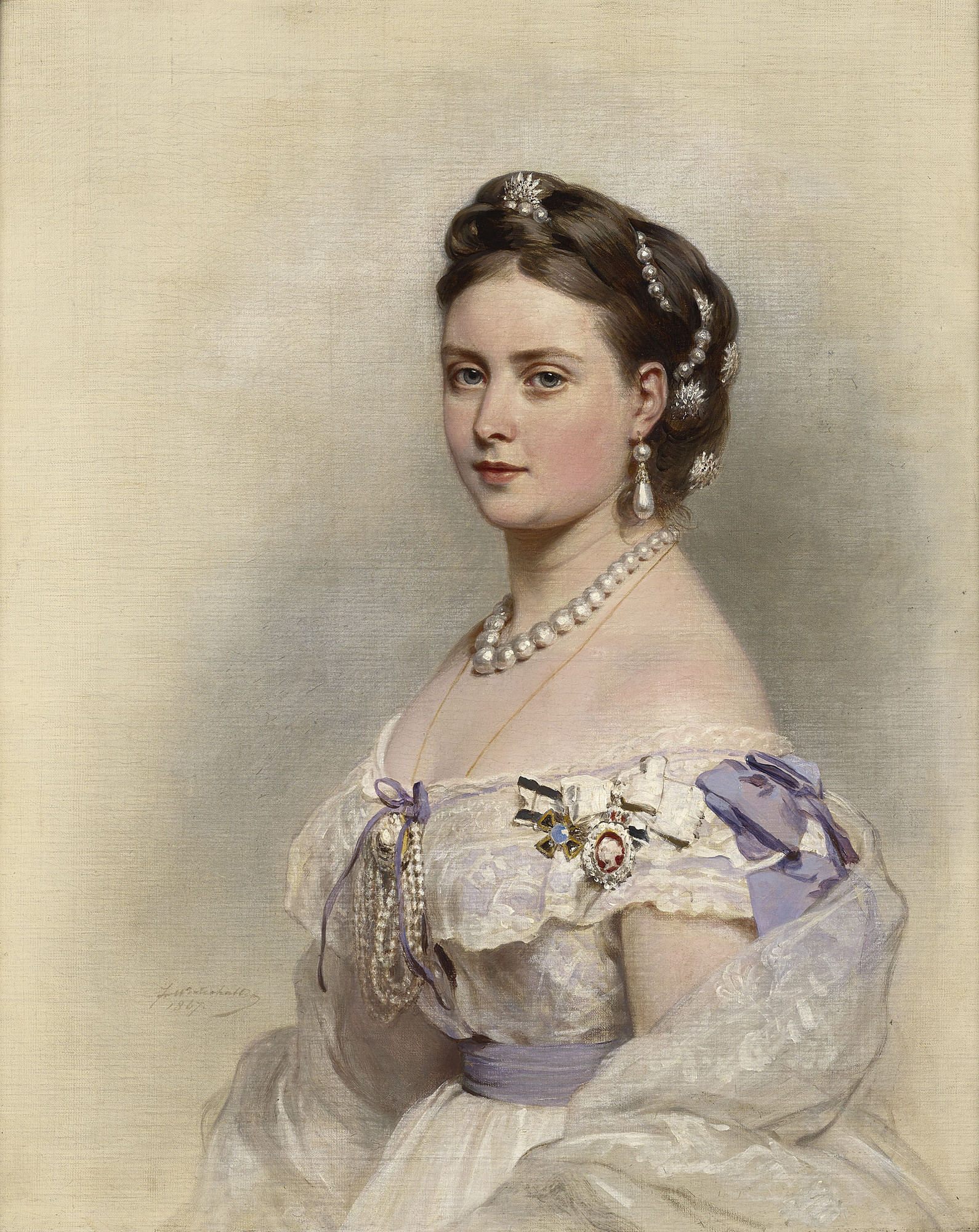
Victoria, Princess Royal—eldest daughter of Queen Victoria of the United Kingdom—whom Frederick married in 1858

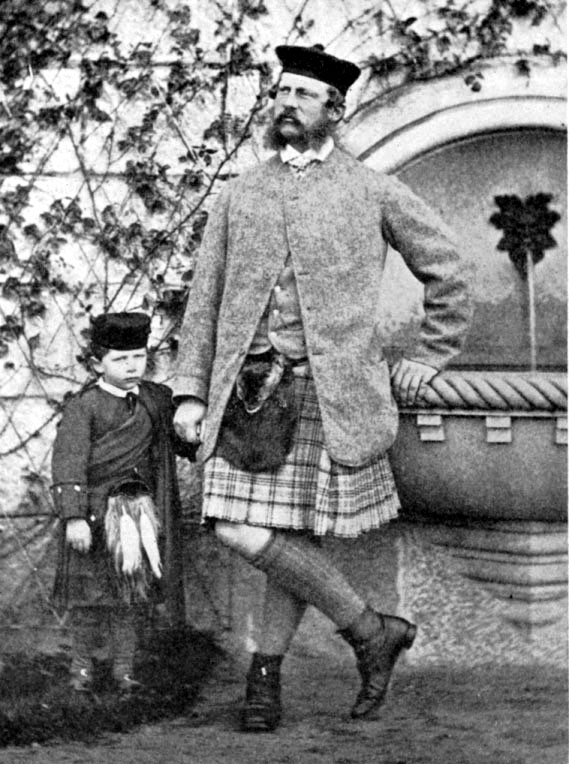
Frederick and his son, Wilhelm, in October 1863 at Balmoral castle

Royal marriages of the 19th century were arranged to secure alliances and to maintain blood ties among the European nations. As early as 1851, Queen Victoria of the United Kingdom and her German-born husband, Prince Albert, were making plans to marry their eldest daughter, Victoria, Princess Royal, to Frederick. The royal dynasty in Britain was predominantly German; there was little British blood in Queen Victoria, and none in her husband. They desired to maintain their family's blood ties to Germany, and Prince Albert further hoped that the marriage would lead to the liberalization and modernization of Prussia. King Leopold I of Belgium, uncle of both Victoria and Albert, also favoured this pairing; he had long treasured Baron Stockmar's idea of a marriage alliance between Britain and Prussia. Frederick's father, Prince William, had no interest in the arrangement, hoping instead for a Russian grand duchess as his daughter-in-law. However, Princess Augusta was greatly in favour of a match for her son that would bring closer connections with Britain. In 1851, his mother sent Frederick to England, ostensibly to visit the Great Exhibition but in truth, she hoped that the cradle of liberalism and home of the industrial revolution would have a positive influence on her son. Prince Albert took Frederick under his wing during his stay but it was Albert's daughter, only eleven at the time, who guided the German prince around the Exhibition. Frederick only knew a few words of English, while Princess Victoria could converse fluently in German. He was impressed by her mix of innocence, intellectual curiosity and simplicity, and their meeting proved to be a success. A regular exchange of letters between Victoria and Frederick followed.

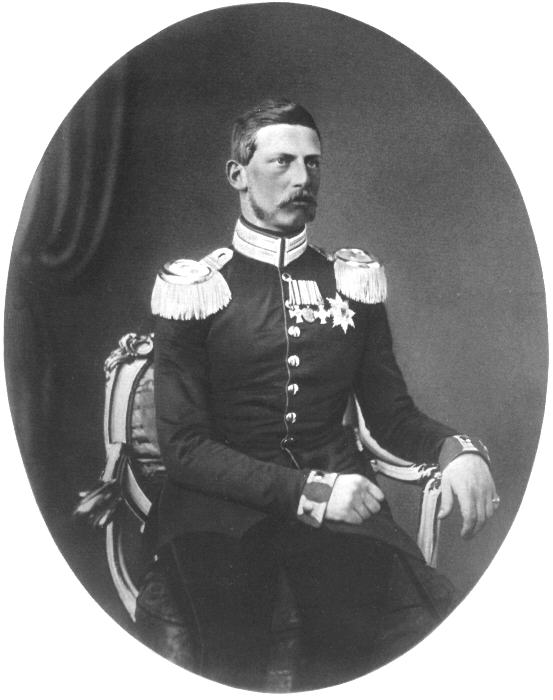
Prince Frederick, c. 1855

Frederick proposed to Victoria in 1855, when she was 14 years old. The betrothal of the young couple was announced on 19 May 1857, at Buckingham Palace and the Prussian Court, and their marriage took place on 25 January 1858 in the Chapel Royal of St James's Palace, London. To mark the occasion, Frederick was promoted to major-general in the Prussian army. Although it was an arranged marriage, the newlyweds were compatible from the start and their marriage was a loving one; Victoria too had received a liberal education and shared her husband's views. Of the two, Victoria was the dominant one in the relationship. The couple often resided at the Crown Prince's Palace and had eight children: Wilhelm in 1859, Charlotte in 1860, Henry in 1862, Sigismund in 1864, Victoria in 1866, Waldemar in 1868, Sophia in 1870 and Margaret in 1872. Sigismund died at the age of 2 and Waldemar at age 11, and their eldest son, Wilhelm, suffered from a withered arm—probably Erb's Palsy due to his difficult and dangerous breech birth, although it could have also resulted from a mild case of cerebral palsy. Wilhelm, who became emperor after Frederick's death, shared none of his parents' liberal ideas; his mother viewed him as a "complete Prussian". This difference in ideology created a rift between Wilhelm and his parents (which was exacerbated by Bismarck's interference), and relations between them were strained throughout their lives.

== Crown Prince of Prussia ==
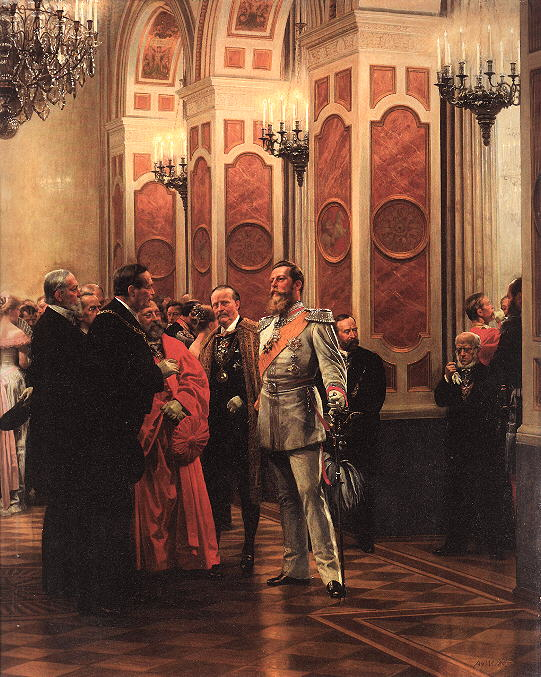
William allowed Frederick few official duties, such as attending balls and socializing with dignitaries (painting by Anton von Werner).

When his father succeeded to the Prussian throne as King William I on 2 January 1861, Frederick became the Crown Prince. Already twenty-nine years old, he would be Crown Prince for a further twenty-seven years. The new king was initially considered politically neutral; Frederick and Prussia's liberal elements hoped that he would usher in a new era of liberal policies. The liberals managed to greatly increase their majority in the Prussian Diet (Landtag), but William soon showed that he preferred the conservative ways. On the other hand, Frederick declared himself in complete agreement with the "essential liberal policy for internal and foreign affairs". As Crown Prince, he had conflicts with Otto von Bismarck, the chancellor whom his father had appointed.

Because William was a dogmatic soldier and unlikely to change his ideas at the age of sixty-four, he regularly clashed with the Diet over policies. In September 1862, one such disagreement almost led to Frederick being crowned and replacing his father as king; William threatened to abdicate when the Diet refused to fund his plans for the army's reorganization. Frederick was appalled by this action, and said that an abdication would "constitute a threat to the dynasty, country and Crown". William reconsidered, and instead on the advice of Minister of War Albrecht von Roon appointed Otto von Bismarck, who had offered to push through the military reform even against the majority of the Diet, as Minister-President. The appointment of Bismarck, an authoritarian who would often ignore or overrule the Diet, set Frederick on a collision course with his father and led to his exclusion from affairs of state for the rest of William's reign. Frederick insisted on bloodless "moral conquests", unifying Germany by liberal and peaceful means, but it was Bismarck's policy of blood and iron that prevailed. Frederick's protests against Bismarck's policies peaked at Danzig on 4 June 1863, where at an official reception in the city he loudly denounced Bismarck's restrictions on freedom of the press. He thereby made Bismarck his enemy and his father extremely angry. Consequently, Frederick was excluded from positions of political power throughout his father's reign. Retaining his military portfolio, he continued to represent Germany and its Emperor at ceremonies, weddings, and celebrations such as Queen Victoria's Golden Jubilee in 1887. Frederick would spend a large portion of time in Britain, where Queen Victoria frequently allowed him to represent her at ceremonies and social functions.

Frederick fought in the wars against Denmark, Austria and France. Although he had opposed military action in each case, once war had started he supported the Prussian military wholeheartedly and took positions of command. Since he had no political influence at all, these were opportunities to prove himself. Frederick experienced his first combat in the Second Schleswig War. Appointed to supervise the supreme German Confederation commander Field Marshal Wrangel and his staff, the Crown Prince tactfully managed disputes between Wrangel and the other officers. The Prussians and their Austrian allies defeated the Danes and conquered the southern part of Jutland, but after the war, they spent two years politicking to assume leadership of the German states. This culminated in the Austro-Prussian War. Frederick "was the only member of the Prussian Crown Council to uphold the rights of the Duke of Augustenberg and oppose the idea of a war with Austria which he described as fratricide." Although he supported unification and the restoration of the medieval empire, "Fritz could not accept that war was the right way to unite Germany."

However, when war with Austria broke out, Frederick accepted command of one of Prussia's three armies. He commanded the Second Army, with General Leonhard Graf von Blumenthal as his chief of staff. At first, the Austrian Army defeated the Second Army in the Battle of Trautenau on 27 June 1866. However, next day, Frederick ordered his divisions to attack the Austrian X Corps from early in the morning, which brought Prussia's victory. His plan was successful, leading the victory of Battle of Burkersdorf. On that day, when the two battles (Battle of Burkersdorf, and Battle of Skalitz) were fought by his Second Army, he was at Kosteletz in order to reach the battlefield easily. On 29 June, Frederick ordered his army to advance. He established his headquarters in Kaile. Now he reached the Elbe. On June 30, Helmuth von Moltke ordered him to station his army in the Elbe. At Moltke's command, he didn't order the advance but, from 8 o'clock on July 3, his troops started the advance. The timely arrival of his army was crucial to the Prussian victory in 1866 at the decisive Battle of Königgrätz, which won the war for Prussia. Nevertheless, the bloodshed caused him great dismay. A few days before Königgrätz, Frederick had written to his wife, expressing his hope that this would be the last war he would have to fight. On the third day of the battle he wrote to her again: "Who knows whether we may not have to wage a third war in order to keep what we have now won?"

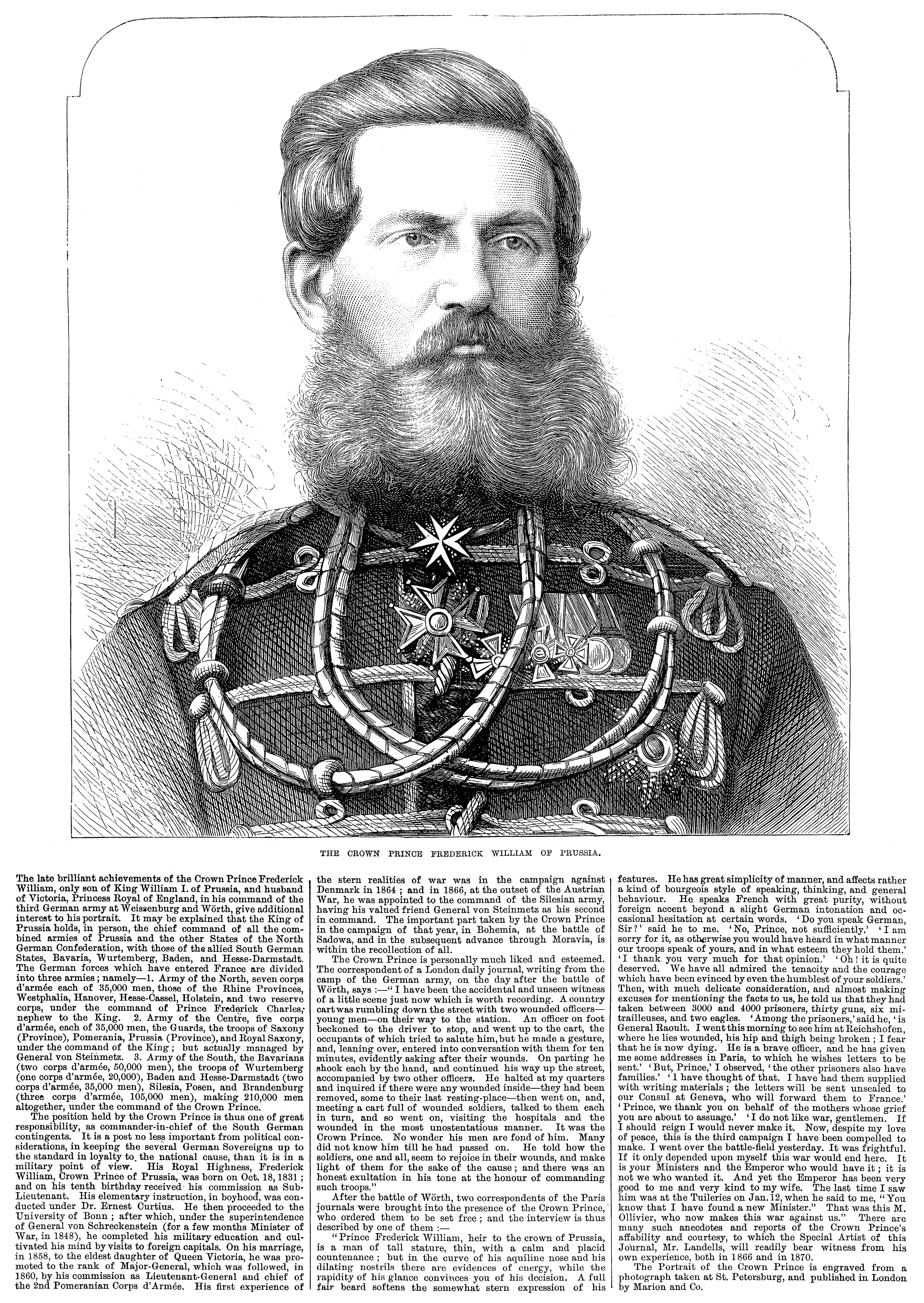
20 August 1870, Illustrated London News celebrates the Crown Prince's Franco-Prussian War achievements

Four years later Frederick was in action again, this time during the Franco-Prussian War of 1870, in which he was once more paired with Blumenthal and commanded the Third Army, consisting of troops from the southern German states by some political reasons. He was praised for his leadership after defeating the French at the battles of Wissembourg and Wörth, and met with further successes at the Battle of Sedan and during the siege of Paris. Frederick was promoted to field marshal on 28 October 1870. Frederick's humane treatment of his country's foes earned him their respect and the plaudits of neutral observers. After the Battle of Wörth, a London journalist witnessed the Crown Prince's many visits to wounded Prussian soldiers and lauded his deeds, extolling the love and respect the soldiers held for Frederick. Following his victory, Frederick had remarked to two Paris journalists, "I do not like war gentlemen. If I should reign I would never make it." One French journalist remarked that "the Crown Prince has left countless traits of kindness and humanity in the land that he fought against." For his behaviour and accomplishments, The Times wrote a tribute to Frederick in July 1871, stating that "the Prince has won as much honour for his gentleness as for his prowess in the war". After the war, Frederick was awarded with Grand Cross of the Iron Cross.

== Crown Prince of the German Empire ==
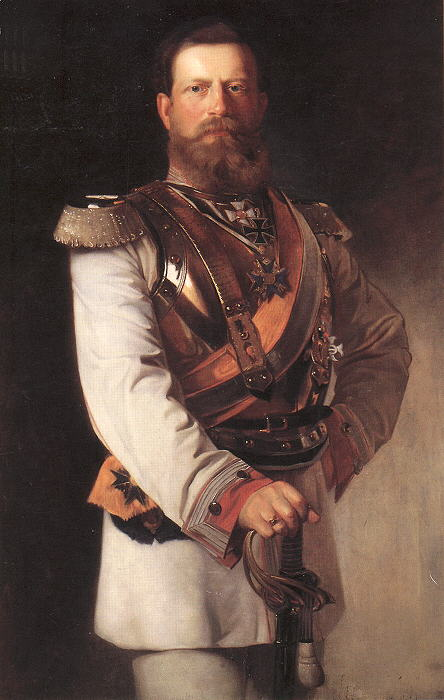
Frederick as Crown Prince, 1874, by Heinrich von Angeli

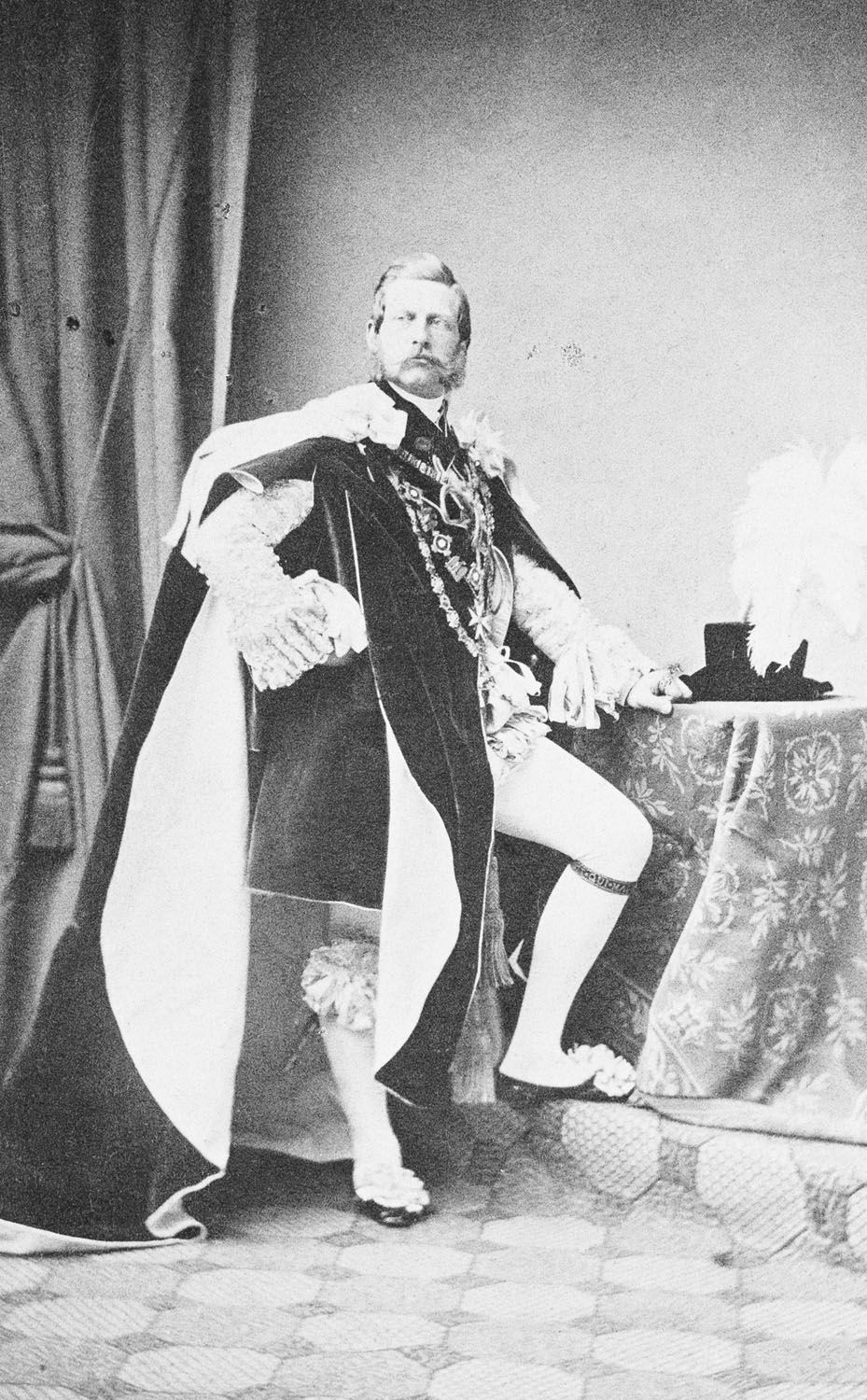
Friedrich III in Garter Ceremonial Robes

In 1871, following Prussia's victories, the German states were united into the German Empire, with William as the Emperor and Frederick as heir-apparent to the new German monarchy. Although William thought the day when he became Emperor the saddest of his life, Frederick was excited to be witness to a great day in German history. Bismarck, now Chancellor, disliked Frederick and distrusted the liberal attitudes of the Crown Prince and Princess. Often at odds with his father's and Bismarck's policies and actions, Frederick sided with the country's liberals in their opposition to the expansion of the empire's army. The Crown Prince also became involved in many public works projects, such as the establishment of schools and churches in the area of Bornstedt near Potsdam. To assist his father's effort to turn Berlin, the capital city, into a great cultural centre, he was appointed Protector of Public Museums; it was largely due to Frederick that considerable artistic collections were acquired, housed in Berlin's new Kaiser Friedrich Museum (later known as the Bode Museum) after his death. In 1878, when his father was incapacitated by injury from an assassination attempt, Frederick briefly took over his tasks but was soon relegated to the sidelines once again. His lack of influence affected him deeply, even causing him to contemplate suicide.

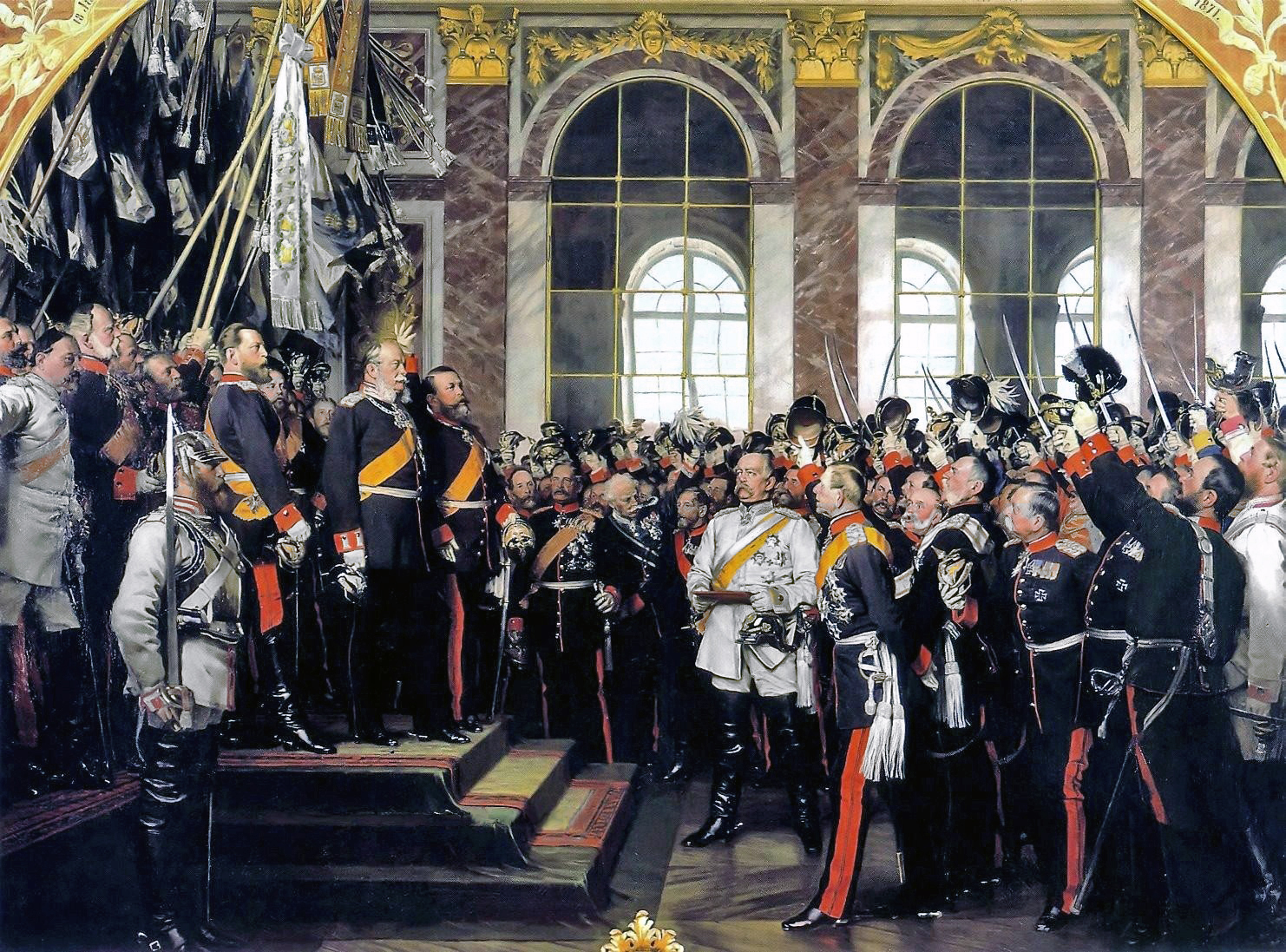
Anton von Werner's depiction of William's proclamation as Emperor. Frederick is standing behind his father, while his brother-in-law, the Grand Duke of Baden leads the cheering.

During an effort led, between 1879 and 1881, by the völkisch historian Heinrich von Treitschke and the court chaplain, Adolf Stoecker, to dis-emancipate German Jews, the Crown Prince and Crown Princess were in opposition, Victoria writing that she saw "Treitschke and his supporters as lunatics of the most dangerous sort", and opining that Pastor Stoecker properly belonged in an insane asylum. She went on to write that she felt ashamed of her adopted country because people like Treitschke and Stoecker "behave so hatefully towards people of a different faith and another race who become an integral part (and by no means the worst) of our nation!". Clad in the uniform of a Prussian field marshal, Frederick, together with Victoria, attended a synagogue service in Berlin in 1880 to show support for tolerance in contrast to what Victoria called Treitschke's "disgraceful attacks". Shortly afterward, Frederick gave a speech denouncing the anti-Semitic movement in Germany as "a shameful blot on our time", adding that "We are ashamed of the Judenhetze [agitation against Jews] which has broken all bounds of decency in Berlin, but which seems to flourish under the protection of the Court clerics." In 1881, Frederick and Victoria again attended a synagogue service, this time in Wiesbaden "to demonstrate as clearly as we can what our convictions are". Frederick followed this up by giving a speech in which he spoke out for "poor, ill-treated Jews" of Europe. Frederick's mother-in-law, Queen Victoria, wrote to thank him for his speech, saying she was proud that her daughter had married someone like him, but within Junker circles, Frederick was widely criticised for his actions in support of the Jews. Prominent among the Crown Prince's critics was his eldest son, Wilhelm, who called his father a weak, cowardly man controlled by his British wife and the Jews. Beyond Wilhelm, many of the "reactionary and 'chauvinistic' circles in Germany" had, in the words of the British historian John C. G. Röhl, come to the "conviction that the Crown Prince and his liberal English wife were an alien, un-German force that must not be allowed to accede to the throne".

== Illness and decline ==
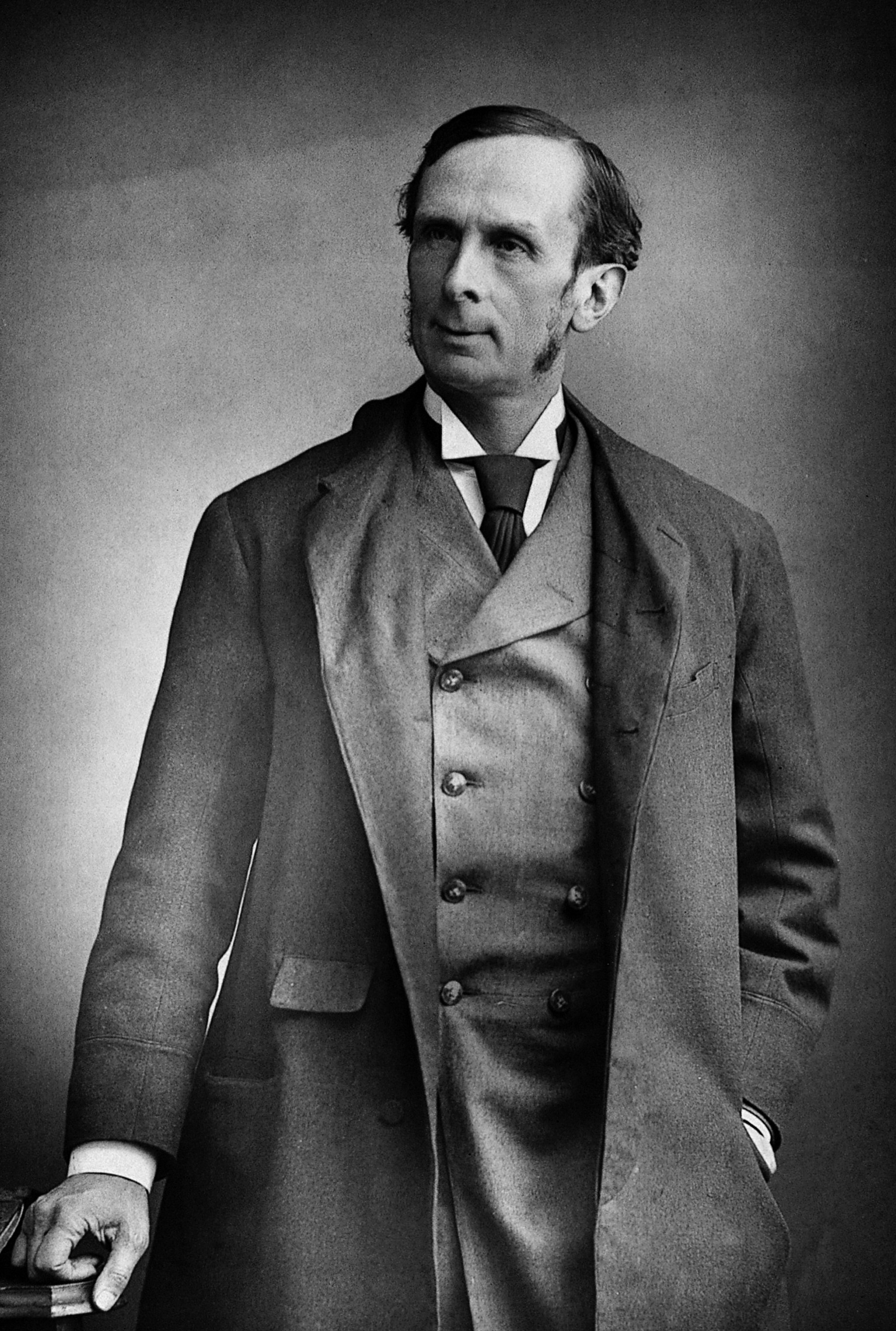
Morell Mackenzie, whose treatment of Frederick caused controversy

Frederick had been a heavy smoker for many years. At a ball held by William on 31 January 1887, a guest reported the Crown Prince "was so hoarse that he could hardly say a word." His hoarseness continued through February, and was diagnosed as a thickening of the mucous membrane over the vocal cords, caused by "a chronic laryngeal catarrh." On 7 February, Frederick consulted a doctor, Karl Gerhardt, who scraped a wire across the membrane for 10 days in an attempt to remove thickened tissue. After the procedure proved unsuccessful, Gerhardt cauterised the left vocal cord with an electric wire on 15 March in an attempt to remove what was then thought to be a vocal fold nodule. Due to Frederick's highly inflamed throat, Gerhardt was unable to remove the entire growth. After several cauterisations, and with no signs of improvement, Frederick and his wife went to the spa of Bad Ems, where he drank the mineral waters and underwent a regimen of gargles and inhaling fresh air, with no effect.

On 17 May, Gerhardt and other doctors, including Ernst von Bergmann, diagnosed the growth as laryngeal cancer. Bergmann recommended consulting a leading British cancer specialist, Morell Mackenzie; he also recommended a thyrotomy to gain better access to the inside of the larynx, followed by the complete removal of the larynx – a total laryngectomy – if the situation proved serious. While Victoria was informed of the need for an immediate operation, Frederick was not told. Despite the tentative diagnosis of cancer, the doctors hoped the growth would prove to be a benign epithelioma. A room on the top floor of the Crown Prince's palace was then equipped as an operating theatre, but Bergmann elected to put the operation on hold until Mackenzie could provide his assessment. Mackenzie arrived in Berlin on 20 May, but after examining Frederick recommended a biopsy of the growth to determine whether or not it was malignant. He conducted the biopsy the following morning, after which he sent tissue samples to the distinguished pathologist Rudolf Virchow for microscopic examination. When Virchow was unable to detect any cancerous cells despite several separate analyses, Mackenzie declared his opposition to a laryngectomy being performed, as he felt it would be invariably fatal, and said he would assume charge of the case. He gave his assurance that Frederick would fully recover "in a few months." While Gerhardt and Physician-General August Wegner concurred with Mackenzie, Bergmann and his colleague Adalbert Tobold held to their original diagnosis of cancer. In addition to Mackenzie's opinion, Bismarck strongly opposed any major operation on Frederick's throat, and pressed the Kaiser to veto it. On 9 June, Mackenzie again biopsied the growth and sent the samples to Virchow, who reported the following day that he was again unable to detect any signs of cancer.

On 13 June, the Crown Prince left Potsdam for London to attend his mother-in-law's Golden Jubilee and to consult Mackenzie. He never saw his father alive again. He was accompanied by Victoria and their three younger daughters, along with Gerhardt; on 29 June, Mackenzie reported that he had successfully operated at his Harley Street clinic, and had removed "nearly the entire growth." Frederick spent July with his family at Norris Castle on the Isle of Wight. However, when Frederick visited Mackenzie's office on 2 August for a follow-up examination, the growth had reappeared, necessitating its cauterisation the same day, and again on 8 August – an ominous indication that it was indeed malignant. Felix Semon, a distinguished German throat specialist with a practice in England, and who had been closely following Frederick's case, submitted a report to the German Foreign Secretary in which he strongly criticised Mackenzie's cauterisations, and gave his opinion that the growth, if not malignant, was suspect, and should continue to be biopsied and examined. On 9 August, Frederick travelled to Braemar in the Scottish Highlands with Dr. Mark Hovell, a senior surgeon at the Throat Hospital in London. Although a further examination by Mackenzie on 20 August revealed no sign of a recurrent growth, Frederick said he had the "constant feeling" of something "not right inside"; nonetheless, he asked Queen Victoria to knight Mackenzie, who duly received a knighthood in September.

Despite the operations on his throat and having taken the sea air at Cowes, Frederick remained hoarse and was advised by Mackenzie to spend the coming winter on the Italian Riviera. In August, following reports that his father was gravely ill, he considered returning to Germany, but was dissuaded by his wife, and went to Toblach in South Tyrol with his family, where Victoria had rented a house. He arrived in Toblach on 7 September, exhausted and hoarse. Concerned by Frederick's lack of visible improvement after a brief meeting with Frederick in Munich, Philipp, Prince of Eulenburg, consulted the distinguished laryngologist Max Joseph Oertel, who urged a drastic and thorough operation on Frederick's throat, and said he suspected a benign tumour which could soon become malignant. By this time, Mackenzie's treatment of Frederick was generating strong criticism. After a fortnight in Toblach, Mackenzie arrived to reexamine Frederick, who had continued to suffer from colds and hoarseness; in public, however, the doctor remained largely unconcerned, and attributed the hoarseness to a "momentary chill." However, he recommended that Frederick should leave Toblach for Venice, to be followed by Victoria. The weather soon turned cold, and Frederick's throat caused him pain, for which he received cocaine injections.

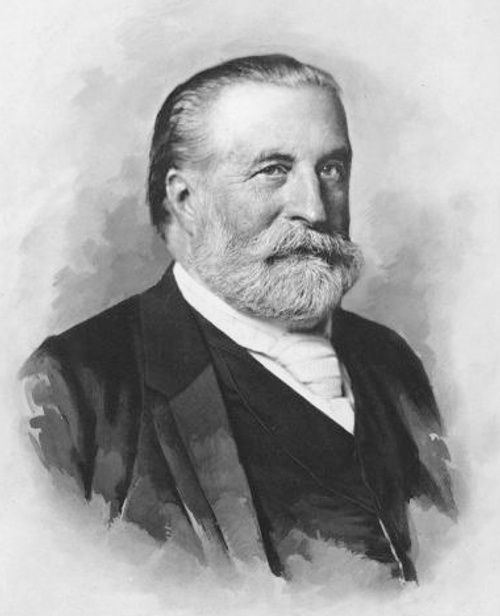
Professor Ernst von Bergmann, who attended to Frederick throughout his illness

Upon arriving in Venice, Frederick again caught cold; privately, Mackenzie was growing seriously concerned, having observed a continued tendency for Frederick's throat and larynx to swell. He forbade Frederick from speaking at any length, noting that if the Crown Prince insisted on speaking and contracted further colds, he could give him no more than three months to live. At the beginning of October, Victoria noted that "Fritz's throat is giving no cause for fresh anxiety & he really does take a little more care and speaks a little less." On 6 October, Frederick, his family and Mackenzie left for a villa at Baveno on the shore of Lake Maggiore, with Mackenzie leaving Baveno on 8 October, after predicting Frederick's recovery "in 3 or 4 months," wrote Victoria. Their elder son Wilhelm joined them at Baveno on 17 October for Frederick's 56th birthday the following day. At the end of October, Frederick's condition abruptly worsened, with Victoria writing to her mother on 2 November that Frederick's throat was again inflamed, but not due to any cold, and that he was "very hoarse again" and easily became depressed about his health. General Alfred von Waldersee observed that Frederick's health had grave implications as if William died soon and his son succeeded, "a new Kaiser who is not allowed to speak is a virtual impossibility, quite apart from the fact that we desperately need a highly energetic one." His son Wilhelm reported to Albert, King of Saxony that his father was frequently short-tempered and melancholic, though his voice appeared to have slightly improved, and that Frederick's throat was being treated by "blowing in a powder twice a day to soothe the larynx."

On 3 November, Frederick and his entourage departed for San Remo. At San Remo two days later, on 5 November, Frederick entirely lost his voice and experienced severe pain throughout his throat. Upon examination, Dr. Hovell discovered a new growth under the left vocal cord; when the news reached William and the German government, it caused great consternation. The following day, Mackenzie issued a bulletin stating that while there was no immediate danger to the Crown Prince, his illness had "unfortunately taken an unfavourable turn," and that he had requested advice from other specialists, including the Austrian professor of laryngology Leopold Schrötter and Dr. Hermann Krause of Berlin. On 9 November, Schrötter and Krause diagnosed the new growth as malignant, and said it was unlikely Frederick could live another year. All the doctors in attendance, including Mackenzie, now concluded that Frederick's disease was indeed laryngeal cancer, as new lesions had appeared on the right side of the larynx, and that an immediate and total laryngectomy was required to save his life; Moritz Schmidt, one of the doctors, subsequently said that the earlier growths found in May had also been cancerous. Frederick was devastated by the news, bursting into tears upon being informed by Mackenzie and crying, "To think I should have such a horrid disgusting illness ... I had so hoped to have been of use to my country. Why is Heaven so cruel to me? What have I done to be thus stricken and condemned?" Even at this stage, however, Frederick, in a private discussion with his wife, decided against the laryngectomy as it was itself highly risky. He sent his doctors a written statement that he would remain in Italy and would only submit to a tracheotomy if he was at risk of suffocating due to his condition. The news was greeted with shock in Berlin and generated further hatred against Victoria, now seen as a domineering "foreigner" who was manipulating her husband. Some politicians suggested that Frederick be made to relinquish his position in the line of succession in favour of his son Wilhelm, but Bismarck firmly stated that Frederick would succeed his ailing father "whether he is ill or not, [and] whether the K[aiser] is then unable permanently to perform his duties," would then be determined per the relevant provisions of the Prussian Constitution. Despite the renewed diagnosis of cancer, Frederick's condition appeared to improve after 5 November, and he became more optimistic; through January 1888 there remained some hope that the diagnosis was incorrect. Both Frederick and Victoria retained their faith in Mackenzie, who re-examined Frederick's throat several times in December and gave a good prognosis, again doubting whether the growths had been cancerous.

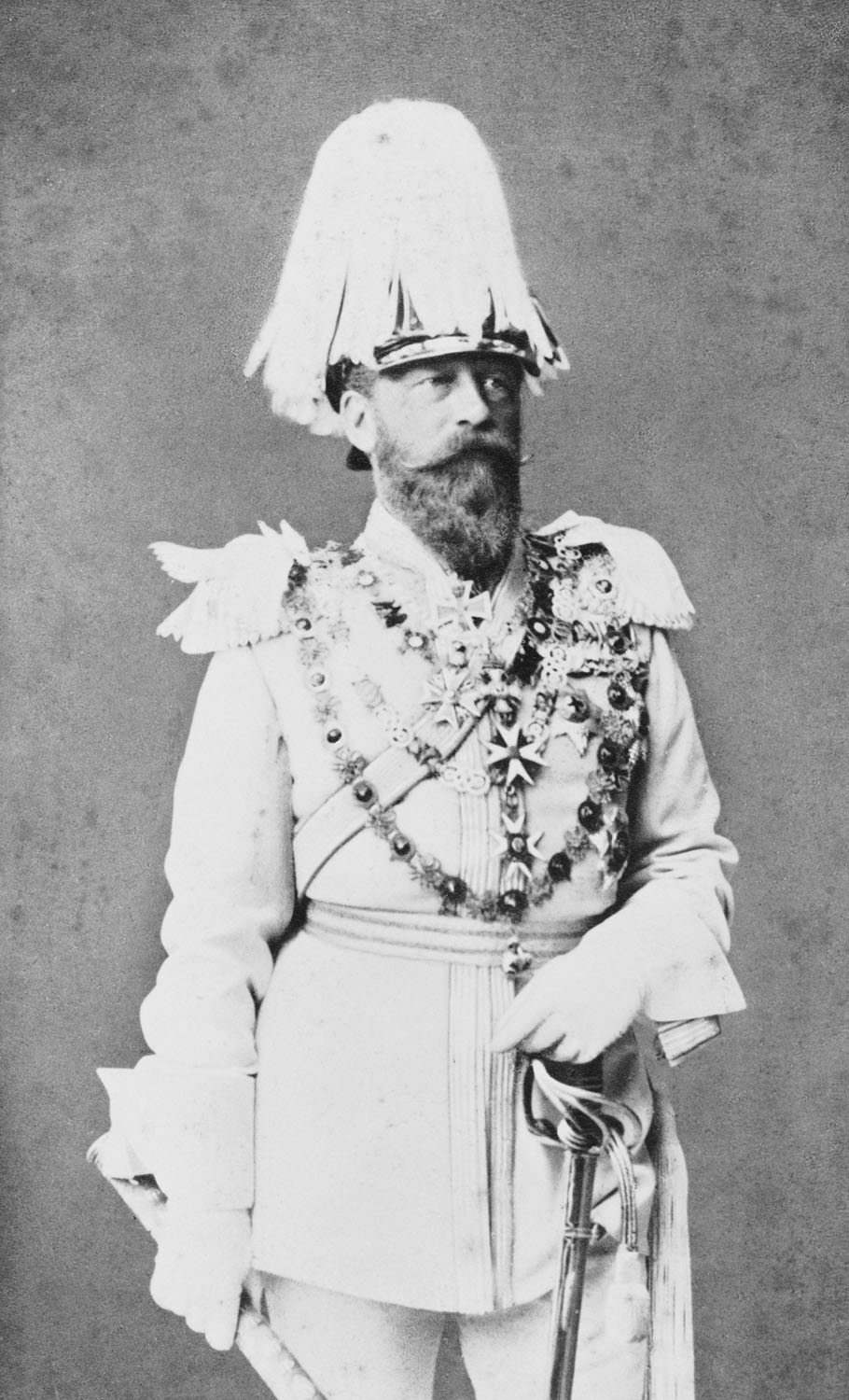
Photograph of Crown Prince Frederick, c. 1887

On 26 December 1887, Frederick wrote that his "chronic catarrh" appeared to be taking "a turn for the better", and that "a further bond has been forged between our people and myself; may God preserve it by giving me, when I resume my duties, the capacity to prove myself worthy of the great trust that has been shown me!" A week later, however, on 5 January 1888, his hoarseness and the swelling under his left vocal cord returned, with the previously unaffected right side of his throat becoming inflamed. He ran high fevers and began coughing violently, with his breathing becoming more laboured. The doctors diagnosed perichondritis, an infection of the throat membrane. Frederick again became unable to speak, and suffered violent headaches and insomnia. On 29 January, Mackenzie returned to San Remo from a trip to Spain, and after examining his patient recommended an immediate tracheotomy. The operation was conducted at 4 p.m. on 8 February, by which time Frederick was continually suffering from insomnia and "embarrassing bouts of suffocation". A tracheal tube was fitted to allow Frederick to breathe; for the remainder of his life he was unable to speak and often communicated through writing. During the operation, Bergmann almost killed Frederick by missing the incision in the trachea and forcing the cannula into the wrong place. Frederick started to cough and bleed, and Bergmann placed his forefinger into the wound to enlarge it. The bleeding subsided after two hours, but Bergmann's actions resulted in an abscess in Frederick's neck, producing pus which would give Frederick discomfort for the remaining months of his life. Later, Frederick would ask "Why did Bergmann put his finger in my throat?" and complain that "Bergmann ill-treated [me]".

Even after the tracheotomy, Frederick continued to run high fevers and suffered from headaches and insomnia. His violent coughing continued, bringing up bloody sputum. Apart from Mackenzie, the other doctors, led by Bergmann, now held the firm opinion that the Crown Prince's disease was cancer and that it had possibly spread to his lungs. The diagnosis of laryngeal cancer was conclusively confirmed on 6 March, when the anatomist Professor Wilhelm Waldeyer, who had come to San Remo, examined Frederick's sputum under a microscope and confirmed the presence of "so-called cancroid bodies...from a cancerous new growth" in the larynx. He further said that there were no signs of any growths in the lungs. Though it finally settled the question, Waldeyer's diagnosis threw all of Mackenzie's treatment of Frederick into doubt. The diagnosis and treatment of Frederick's fatal illness caused some medical controversy well into the next century.

== Brief reign and death ==
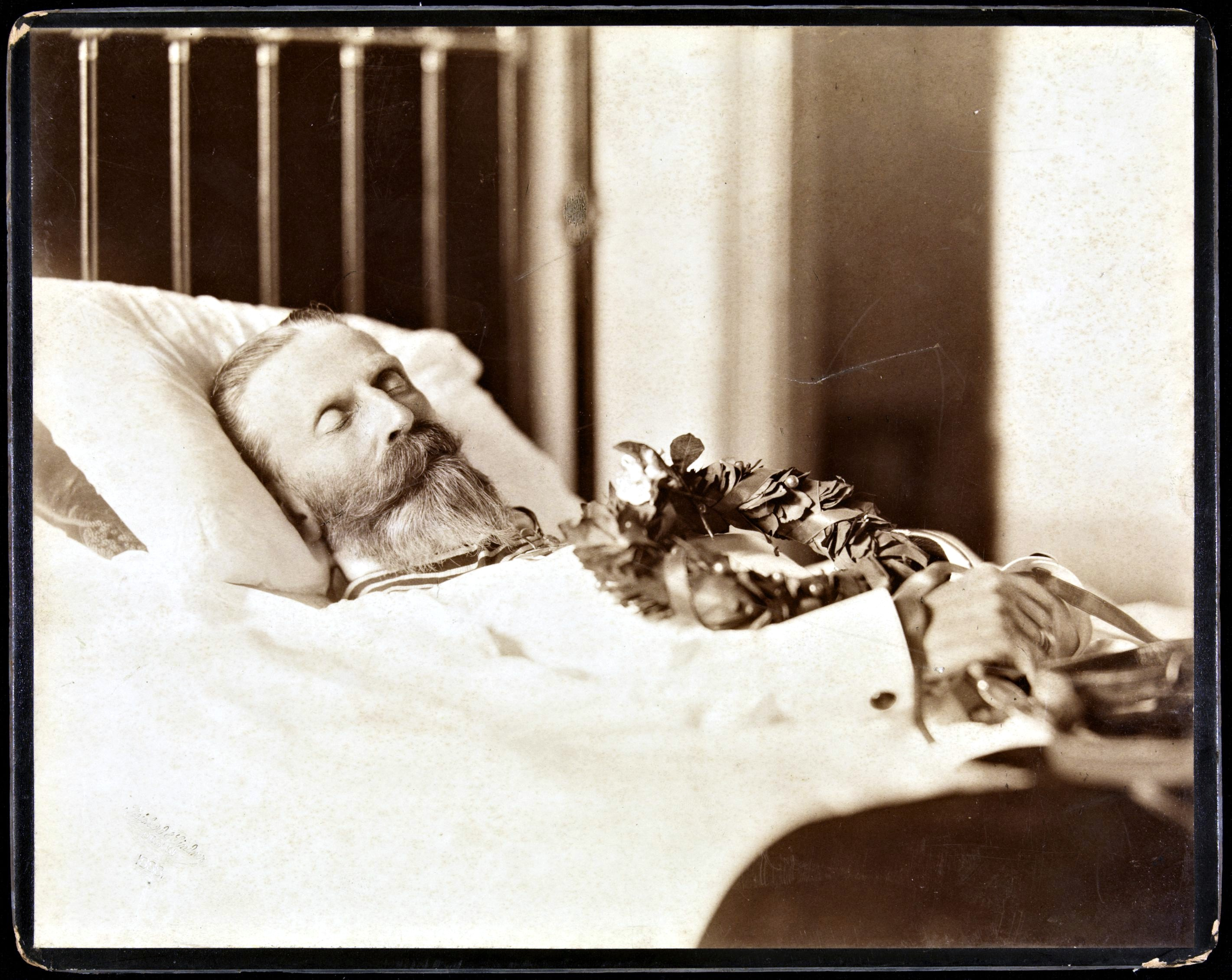
Post mortem portrait of Emperor Frederick III, 1888

Three days after Frederick was confirmed to be suffering from cancer, his father Emperor William I died aged 90 at 8:22 am on 9 March 1888, upon which Frederick became German Emperor and King of Prussia. His son Wilhelm, now Crown Prince, telegraphed the news to his father in Italy. Later the same day, Frederick wrote in his diary that he had received the telegram upon returning from a walk, "...and so I have ascended the throne of my forefathers and of the German Emperor! God help me fulfill my duties conscientiously and for the weal of my Fatherland, in both the narrower and the wider sense." Germany's progressive elements hoped that William's death, and thus Frederick's succession, would usher the country into a new era governed along liberal lines. On the advice of Bismarck, he opted to use Frederick as his regnal name. The new emperor reached Berlin at 11 p.m. on the night of 11 March; those who saw him were horrified by his "pitiful" appearance. The question now was how much longer the mortally ill emperor could be expected to live, and what, if anything, he could hope to achieve. In spite of his illness, Frederick did his best to fulfill his obligations as emperor. Immediately after the announcement of his accession, he took the ribbon and star of his Order of the Black Eagle from his uniform tunic and pinned it on the dress of his wife; he was determined to honor her position as empress. Too ill to march in his father's funeral procession, he was represented by Wilhelm, the new Crown Prince, while he watched, weeping, from his rooms in the Charlottenburg Palace.

As the German Emperor, he officially received Queen Victoria of the United Kingdom (his mother-in-law) and King Oscar II of Sweden and Norway, and attended the wedding of his son Prince Henry to his niece Princess Irene. However, Frederick reigned for only 99 days, and was unable to bring about much lasting change. The majority of the German ruling elite viewed Frederick III's reign as merely a brief interim period before the accession of his son Wilhelm II to the throne. An edict he penned before he ascended to the throne that would limit the powers of the chancellor and monarch under the constitution was never put into effect, although he did force Robert von Puttkamer to resign as Prussian Minister of the Interior on 8 June, when evidence indicated that Puttkamer had interfered in the Reichstag elections. Dr. Mackenzie wrote that the emperor had "an almost overwhelming sense of the duties of his position". In a letter to Lord Napier, Empress Victoria wrote "The Emperor is able to attend to his business, and do a great deal, but not being able to speak is, of course, most trying." Frederick had the fervour but not the time to accomplish his desires, lamenting in May 1888, "I cannot die ... What would happen to Germany?"

From April 1888, Frederick became so weak he was unable to walk, and was largely confined to his bed; his continual coughing brought up large quantities of pus. In early June, the cancer spread to and perforated his esophagus, preventing him from eating. He suffered from bouts of vomiting and ran high fevers, but remained alert enough to write a last diary entry on 11 June: "What's happening to me? I must get well again; I have so much to do!" Frederick III died in Potsdam at 11:30 am on 15 June 1888, and was succeeded by his 29-year-old son Wilhelm II. Frederick III is buried in a mausoleum attached to the Friedenskirche in Potsdam. After his death, William Ewart Gladstone described him as the "Barbarossa of German liberalism". Empress Victoria went on to continue spreading Frederick's thoughts and ideals throughout Germany, but no longer had power within the government. His premature demise is considered a potential turning point in German history.

== Legacy ==
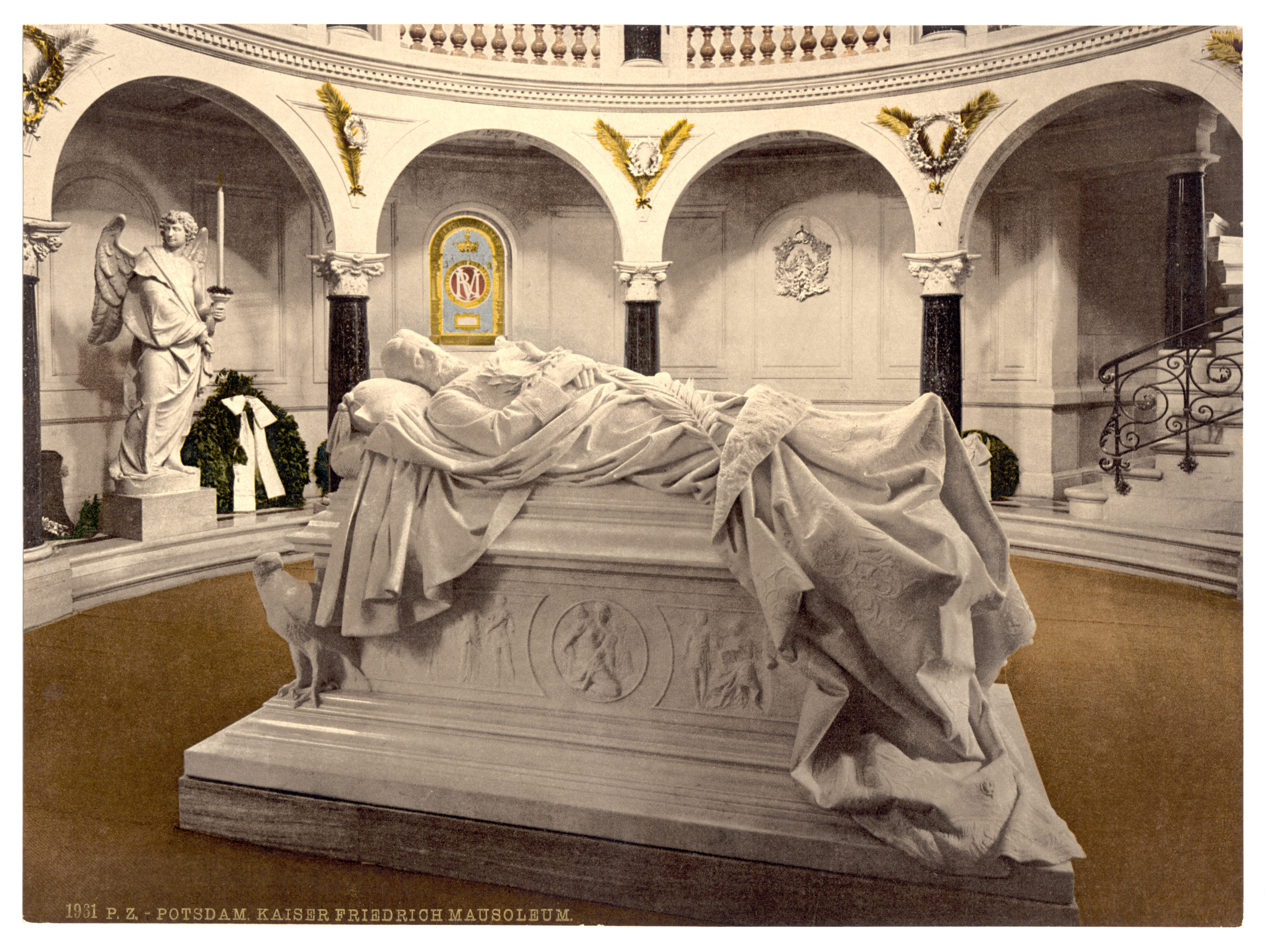
Kaiser-Friedrich-Mausoleum (Potsdam): Frederick is entombed in this sarcophagus, which bears his likeness on top.

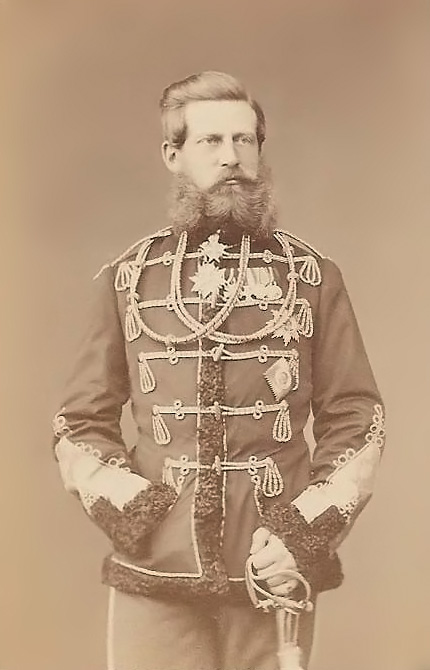
Frederick as Crown Prince, by Sergei Lvovich Levitsky, 1870

Although celebrated as a young man for his leadership and successes during the Second Schleswig, Austro-Prussian and Franco-Prussian wars, he nevertheless professed a hatred of warfare and was praised by friends and enemies alike for his humane conduct. Frederick believed a state should not act against the popular opinion of its inhabitants. He had a long history of liberalism, and had discussed his ideas and intentions with Victoria and others before his reign. Admiring Prince Albert and the British parliamentary system, Frederick and his wife planned to rule as co-monarchs and liberalize Germany through the appointment of more liberal ministers. They intended to severely limit the office of Chancellor, and reorganize Germany to include many elements of British liberalism. Many historians, including William Harbutt Dawson and Erich Eyck, consider that Frederick's early death put an end to the development of liberalism within the German Empire. They believe that, given a longer reign and better health, Frederick might indeed have transformed Germany into a more liberal democratic country, and prevented its militaristic path toward war. Dr. J. McCullough claims that Frederick would have averted World War I—and by extension the resulting Weimar Republic—while other historians such as Michael Balfour go even further by postulating that, as the end of World War I directly affected the state of the world's development, the liberal German Emperor might also have prevented the rise of Adolf Hitler and by extent, preventing the outbreak of World War II. Author Michael Freund states outright that both world wars would have been averted had Frederick lived longer. Frederick's life inspired historian Frank Tipton to speculate: "What would have happened had his father died sooner or if he himself had lived longer?"

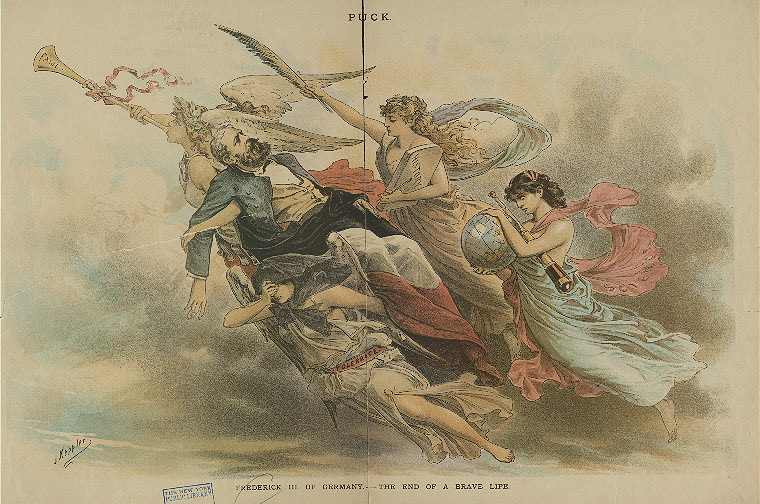
United States magazine Puck mourning the death of Frederick

Other historians, including Wilhelm Mommsen and Arthur Rosenberg, oppose the idea that Frederick could have, or would have, liberalized Germany. They believe that he would not have dared to oppose both his father's legacy and Bismarck to change Germany's course. A natural soldier, he was steeped in his family's strong military tradition, and had happily reported to his father since he joined the army at the age of ten. Andreas Dorpalen notes that Frederick had complied with most of William's and Bismarck's policies early in his life, and would have been unlikely to change his behaviour. According to Arthur Rosenberg, despite his liberal tendencies Frederick still firmly believed in Bismarck and his system, with Dorpalen adding that in any case Frederick had too weak and ineffectual a character to have brought about real change, regardless of how long he reigned. James J. Sheehan states that the political climate and party system of Germany during that period were too steeped in the old ways for Frederick to overcome with liberalization. Dorpalen also observes that Frederick's liberal persona may have been exaggerated after his death, to keep the liberal movement strong in Germany, and he points out that the many mistakes made by Wilhelm II helped to paint his father in a more favorable light.

Frederick's children—Wilhelm in particular—held various political positions and greatly influenced Europe. Unlike his father, Wilhelm had not personally experienced the horrors of war, and he enthusiastically embraced his family's military heritage, coming under Bismarck's tutelage. The Chancellor, who disapproved of Frederick's and Victoria's liberal ways, felt bound to increase the tensions between Wilhelm and his parents. Wilhelm grew up full of disdain for their opinions on government; shortly after his father's death he proclaimed that he would follow the path of his grandfather, William I, and made no reference to Frederick III. Wilhelm II abandoned all of his father's policies and ideas, and eventually led Germany into World War I.

Bismarck's plan of undermining Frederick and Victoria, and of using Wilhelm II as a tool for retaining his own power, led to his own downfall. As it turned out, Wilhelm did share his father's conviction that the position of the chancellor was too strong and should be modified in favour of a more powerful Emperor. Bismarck only realized this when Wilhelm II was about to dismiss him:

All Bismarck's resources were deployed; he even asked Empress Victoria to use her influence with her son on his behalf. But the wizard had lost his magic; his spells were powerless because they were exerted on people who did not respect them, and he who had so signally disregarded Kant's command to use people as ends in themselves had too small a stock of loyalty to draw on. As Lord Salisbury told Queen Victoria: 'The very qualities which Bismarck fostered in the Emperor in order to strengthen himself when the Emperor Frederick should come to the throne have been the qualities by which he has been overthrown.' The Empress, with what must have been a mixture of pity and triumph, told him that her influence with her son could not save him for he himself had destroyed it.

Churches honouring Frederick include the Kaiser-Friedrich-Gedächtniskirche in Berlin and the former Kalthof Church in Königsberg (Kaliningrad, Russia). Mount Frederick William in the Jervis Inlet area of the British Columbia Coast in Canada is named in his honour.

Frederick "described the Imperial Constitution as ingeniously contrived chaos." According to Michael Balfour:

The Crown Prince and Princess shared the outlook of the Progressive Party, and Bismarck was haunted by the fear that should the old Emperor die—and he was now in his seventies—they would call on one of the Progressive leaders to become Chancellor. He sought to guard against such a turn by keeping the Crown Prince from a position of any influence and by using foul means as well as fair to make him unpopular.

== Honours ==
German decorations

- Prussia:
  - Knight of the Black Eagle, 18 October 1841; with Collar, 1849
  - Grand Commander's Cross of the Royal House Order of Hohenzollern, 1851; with Star, 11 September 1869; with Swords, 1873
  - Grand Cross of the Red Eagle, with Oak Leaves, 18 October 1861; with Swords, 1864
  - Knight of the Royal Crown Order, 1st Class, 18 October 1861
  - Pour le Mérite (military), 29 June 1866; with Oak Leaves, 3 August 1866; Grand Cross, 20 September 1866; with Oak Leaves, 2 September 1873
  - Grand Cross of the Iron Cross, 22 March 1871
  - Service Award Cross
- Hohenzollern: Cross of Honour of the Princely House Order of Hohenzollern, 1st Class with Swords
- Ascanian duchies: Grand Cross of the Order of Albert the Bear, 14 February 1853; with Swords, 12 September 1864
- Baden:
  - Knight of the House Order of Fidelity, 1850
  - Grand Cross of the Zähringer Lion, 1850
  - Grand Cross of the Military Karl-Friedrich Merit Order, 1867
- Bavaria:
  - Knight of St. Hubert, 1853
  - Grand Cross of the Military Order of Max Joseph, 28 August 1870
- Brunswick: Grand Cross of the Order of Henry the Lion
- (Saxe-Coburg and Gotha) (Duchy of Saxe-Altenburg) (Saxe-Meiningen) Ernestine duchies: Grand Cross of the Saxe-Ernestine House Order, November 1854
- Hanover:
  - Knight of St. George, 1858
  - Grand Cross of the Royal Guelphic Order, 1858
- Hesse-Kassel: Knight of the Golden Lion, 16 April 1853
- Hesse-Darmstadt:
  - Grand Cross of the Ludwig Order, 11 October 1855
  - Military Merit Cross for 1870/71, 15 March 1871
- Mecklenburg:
  - Grand Cross of the Wendish Crown, with Crown in Ore
  - Military Merit Cross, 1st Class (Schwerin)
  - Cross for Distinction in War (Strelitz)
- Nassau: Knight of the Gold Lion of Nassau, March 1861
- Oldenburg: Grand Cross of the Order of Duke Peter Friedrich Ludwig, with Golden Crown, 17 April 1859; with Swords, 31 December 1870
- Saxe-Weimar-Eisenach: Grand Cross of the White Falcon, 15 December 1848; with Swords, 1870
- Saxony:
  - Knight of the Rue Crown, 1857
  - Grand Cross of the Military Order of St. Henry, 1870
- Schaumburg-Lippe: Military Merit Medal
- Württemberg:
  - Grand Cross of the Württemberg Crown, 1867
  - Grand Cross of the Military Merit Order, 23 October 1870

Foreign decorations

- Austria:
  - Grand Cross of the Royal Hungarian Order of St. Stephen, 1852
  - Knight of the Military Order of Maria Theresa, 1864
  - Service Medal for Officers (25 years)
- Belgium: Grand Cordon of the Order of Leopold, 6 May 1853
- Brazil: Grand Cross of the Southern Cross
- Denmark: Knight of the Elephant, 19 August 1873
- France: Grand Cross of the Legion of Honour, December 1856
- Greece: Grand Cross of the Redeemer
- Hawaii: Grand Cross of the Order of Kamehameha I
- Japan: Grand Cordon of the Order of the Chrysanthemum, 20 May 1880
- Mexico: Grand Cross of the Imperial Order of Guadalupe
- Netherlands:
  - Grand Cross of the Military William Order, 23 August 1878
  - Grand Cross of the Netherlands Lion
- Ottoman Empire:
  - Order of Distinction, in Diamonds
  - Order of Osmanieh, 1st Class
  - Gold Imtiyaz Medal
- Tunisia: Husainid Family Order
- Persia: Order of the August Portrait, in Diamonds
- Portugal:
  - Grand Cross of the Sash of the Two Orders
  - Grand Cross of the Tower and Sword, with Swords
- Qing dynasty: Order of the Double Dragon, Class I Grade I
- Romania: Grand Cross of the Star of Romania, with Swords
- Russia:
  - Knight of St. Andrew, September 1843
  - Knight of St. Alexander Nevsky, September 1843
  - Knight of the White Eagle, September 1843
  - Knight of St. Anna, 1st Class, September 1843
  - Knight of St. Stanislaus, 1st Class, September 1843
  - Knight of St. George, 4th Class, 1869; 2nd Class, 1870
- San Marino: Commander of the Order of San Marino
- Sardinia:
  - Knight of the Annunciation, 11 June 1850
  - Grand Cross of the Military Order of Savoy
  - Gold Medal of Military Valour, 3 July 1866
- Holy See: Grand Cross of the Holy Sepulchre of Jerusalem
- Serbia:
  - Grand Cross of the Cross of Takovo
  - Grand Cross of the White Eagle
- (Thailand) Siam: Grand Cross of the White Elephant
- Spain:
  - Knight of the Golden Fleece, 29 January 1862
  - Grand Cross of the Military Order of St. Ferdinand
- Sweden-Norway:
  - Knight of the Order of Charles XIII, 3 May 1858
  - Knight of the Seraphim, 8 January 1861
  - Grand Cross of St. Olav, 5 August 1873
- Two Sicilies: Grand Cross of St. Ferdinand and Merit
- United Kingdom:
  - Stranger Knight of the Garter, 28 January 1858
  - Honorary Grand Cross of the Bath (military), 25 January 1883
- Venezuela: Collar of the Order of the Liberator

== Issue ==
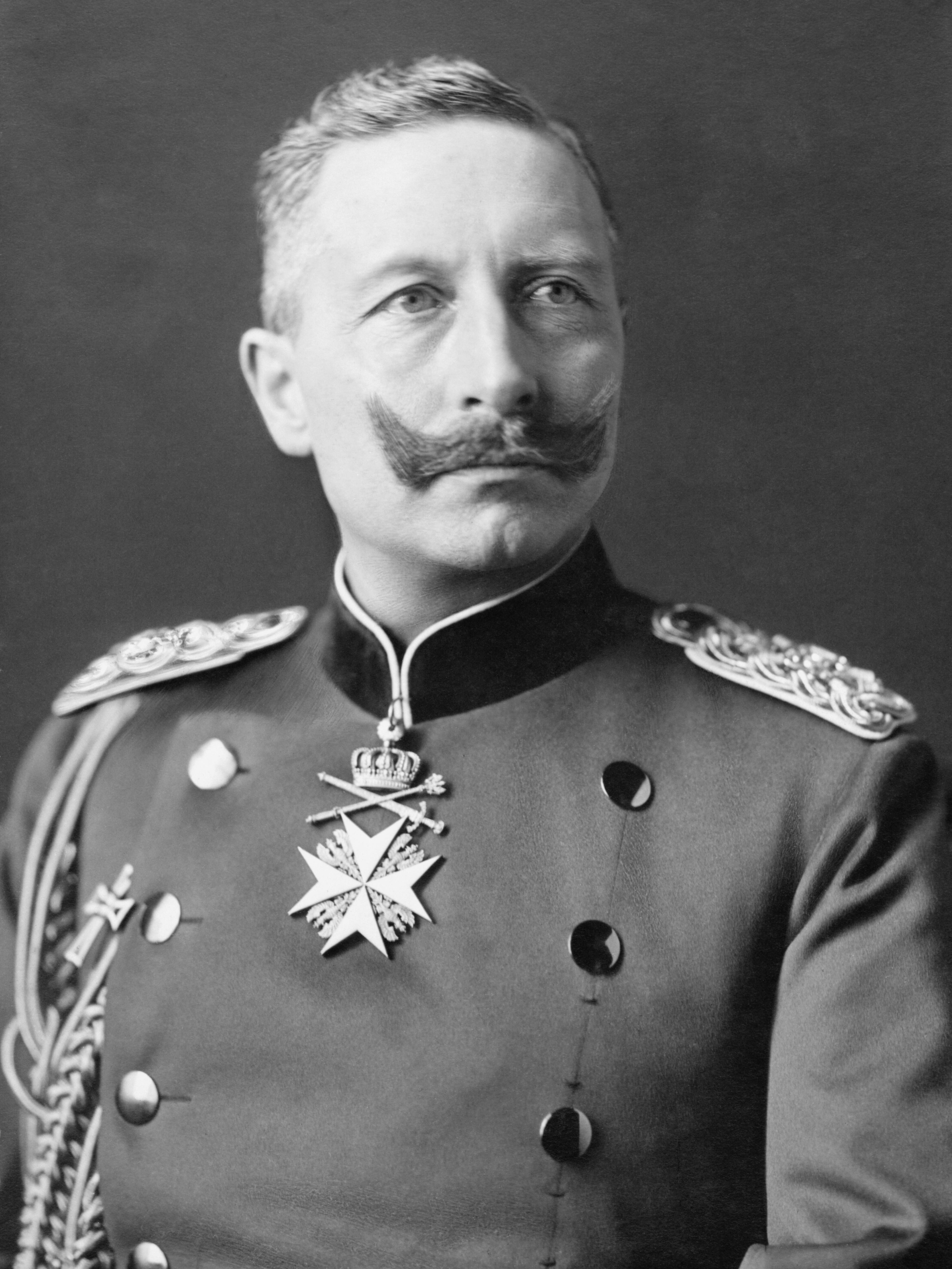
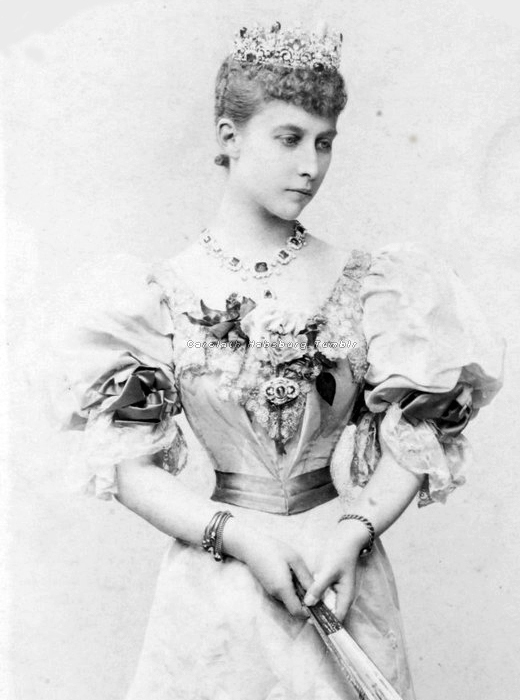
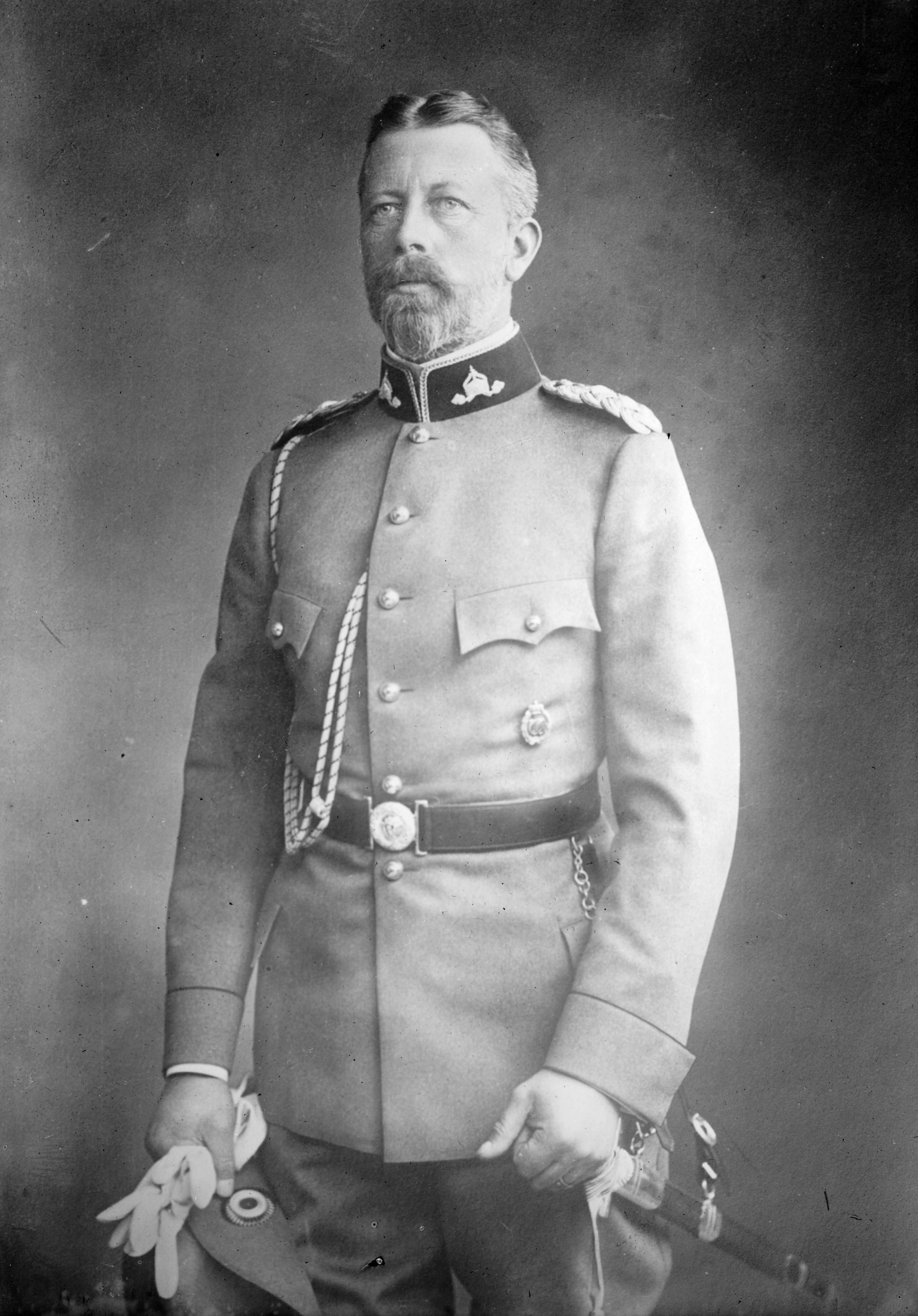
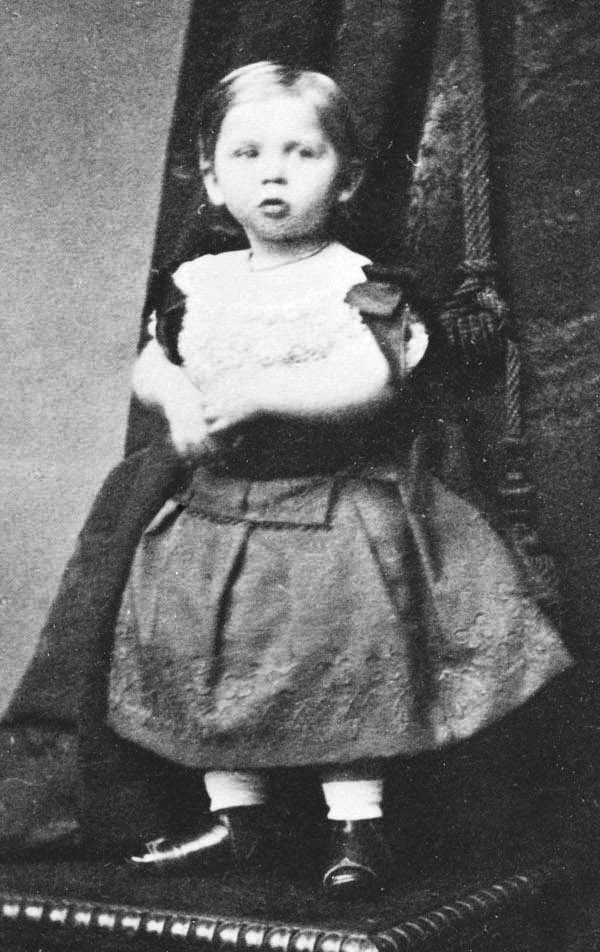
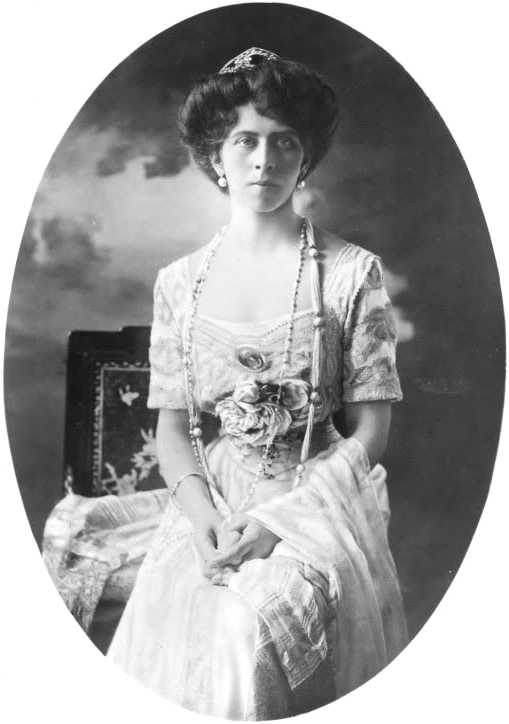
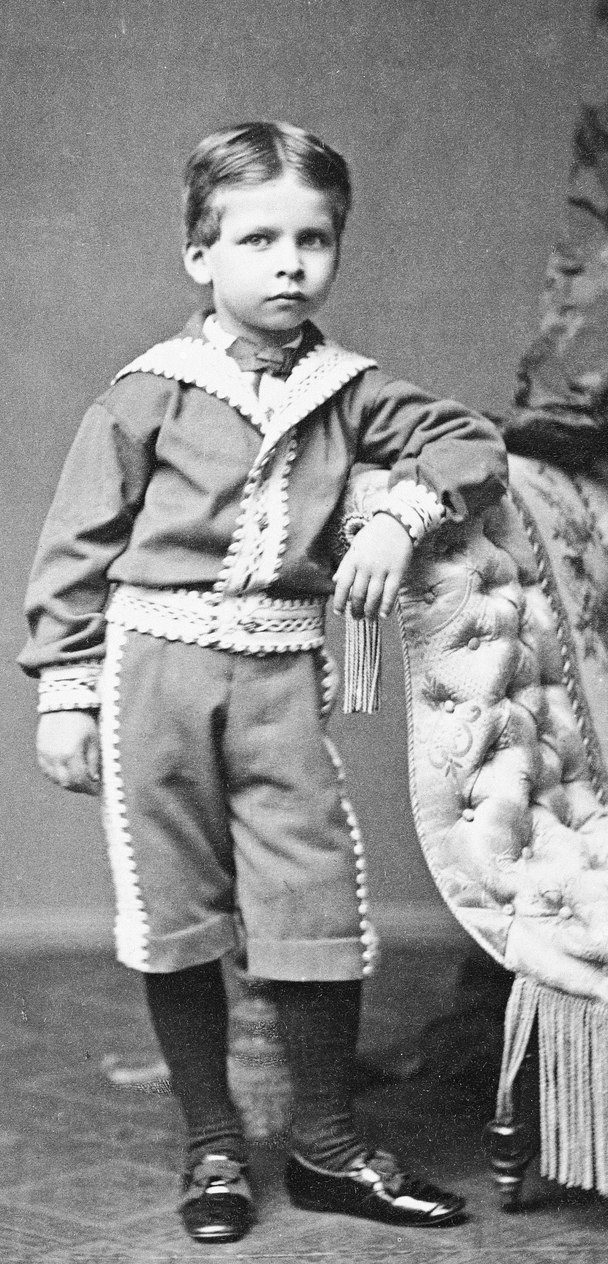
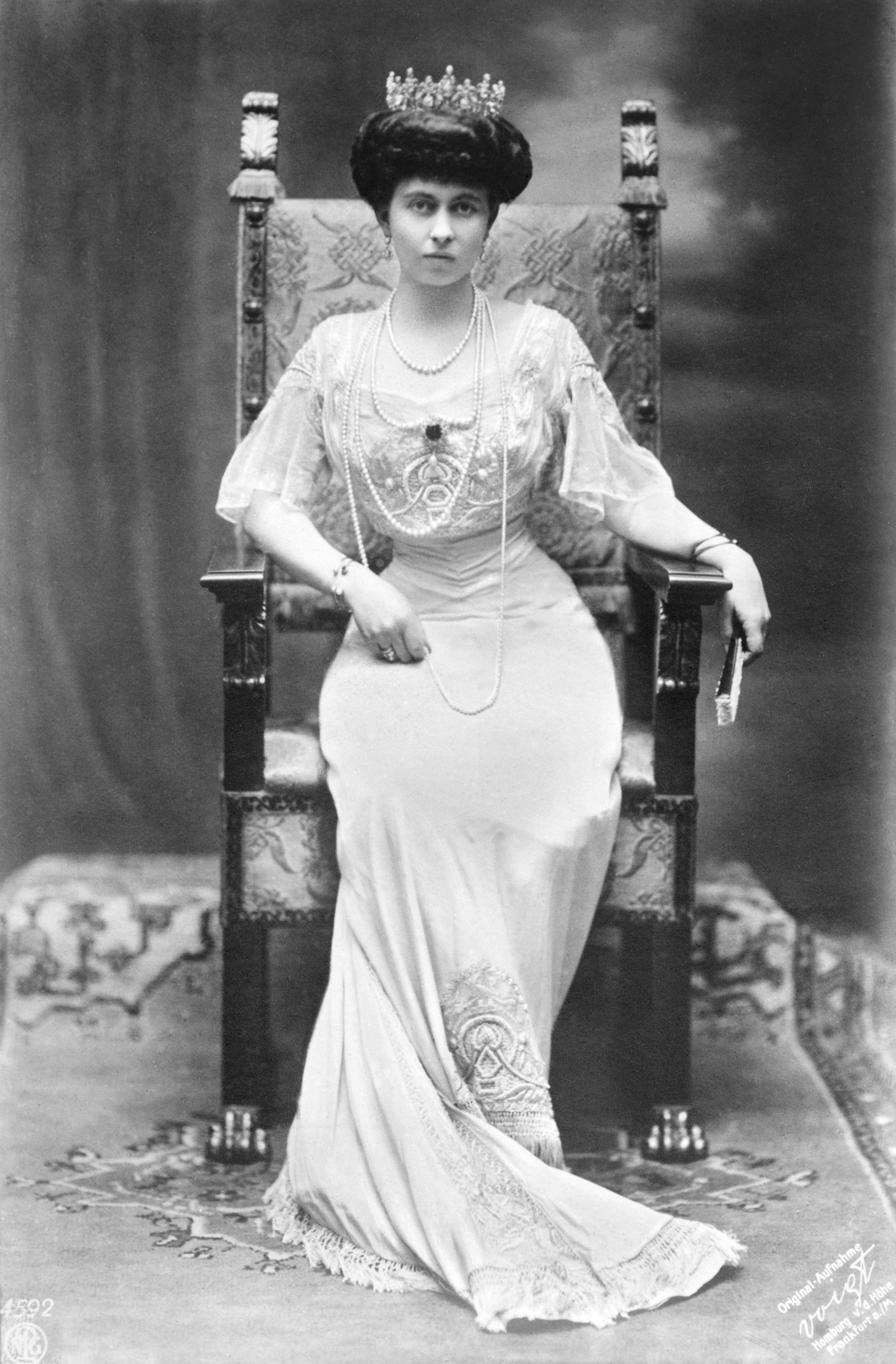
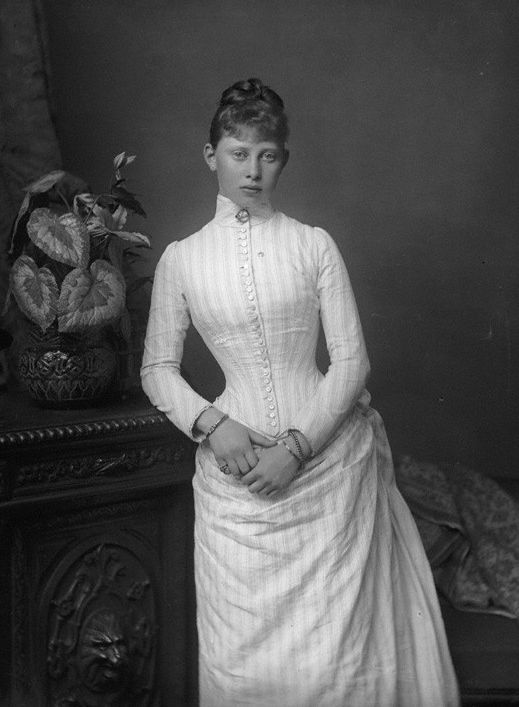
Image	Name	Birth	Death	Notes
	Wilhelm II, German Emperor	27 January 1859	4 June 1941	married (1), 27 February 1881, Princess Auguste Viktoria of Schleswig-Holstein; died 1921; had issue (2), 9 November 1922, Princess Hermine Reuss of Greiz, no issue
	Charlotte, Duchess of Saxe-Meiningen	24 July 1860	1 October 1919	married, 18 February 1878, Bernhard III, Duke of Saxe-Meiningen; had issue
	Prince Henry of Prussia	14 August 1862	20 April 1929	married, 24 May 1888, his first cousin Princess Irene of Hesse and by Rhine; had issue
	Prince Sigismund of Prussia	15 September 1864	18 June 1866	died of meningitis at 21 months. First grandchild of Queen Victoria to die.
	Viktoria, Princess Adolf of Schaumburg-Lippe	12 April 1866	13 November 1929	married (1), 19 November 1890, Prince Adolf of Schaumburg-Lippe; he died 1916; no issue (2), 19 November 1927, Alexander Zoubkov; no issue
	Prince Waldemar of Prussia	10 February 1868	27 March 1879	died of diphtheria at age 11
	Sophia, Queen of the Hellenes	14 June 1870	13 January 1932	married, 27 October 1889, Constantine I, King of the Hellenes; had issue
	Margaret, Landgravine of Hesse-Kassel, Queen of Finland	22 April 1872	22 January 1954	married, 25 January 1893, Prince Frederick Charles of Hesse, king-elect of Finland, later Landgrave of Hesse-Kassel; had issue

== Ancestry ==
Ancestors of Frederick III, German Emperor

8. Frederick William II of Prussia
4. Frederick William III of Prussia
9. Frederica Louisa of Hesse-Darmstadt
2. William I, German Emperor
10. Charles II, Grand Duke of Mecklenburg-Strelitz
5. Louise of Mecklenburg-Strelitz
11. Princess Friederike of Hesse-Darmstadt
1. Frederick III, German Emperor
12. Karl August, Grand Duke of Saxe-Weimar-Eisenach
6. Charles Frederick, Grand Duke of Saxe-Weimar-Eisenach
13. Princess Louise of Hesse-Darmstadt
3. Augusta of Saxe-Weimar-Eisenach
14. Paul I of Russia
7. Maria Pavlovna, Grand Duchess of Saxe-Weimar-Eisenach
15. Sophie Dorothea of Württemberg

== See also ==
- "A Legend of Old Egypt"—an 1888 short story by Bolesław Prus, inspired by Frederick III's tragic premature death.

Frederick III, German Emperor House of Hohenzollern Born: 18 October 1831 Died: 15 June 1888
Regnal titles
Preceded by William I	German Emperor; King of Prussia; 9 March 1888 – 15 June 1888	Succeeded by William II
