= Kalthof Church =

Former Protestant church in Königsberg, Germany

- Kaiser-Friedrich-Gedächtniskirche
- Kaiser-Friedrich-Gedächtniskirche/ Kalthof kirche
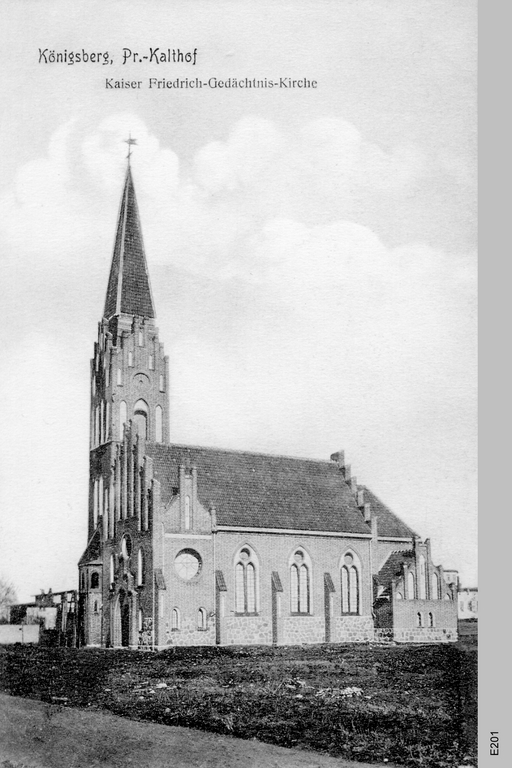
- Kalthof Church
- 54°43′28″N 20°33′11″E
- Denomination: Protestant

History
- Status: Not preserved

Architecture
- Style: Neo-gothic
- Years built: 1905-1907
- Groundbreaking: 1905
- Completed: 1907
- Demolished: 1980s

Kalthof Church (German: Kalthöfische Kirche) was a Protestant church in the Kalthof quarter of eastern Königsberg, Germany.

Berthold Kleist, the last owner of the estate Kalthof, donated land in 1899 and 70,000 marks in 1901 for the building of a new church. Construction of the Neo-Gothic church occurred from 1905 to 1907 and included tiles from Kadinen. The church was formally named the Kaiser-Friedrich-Gedächtniskirche (Emperor Frederick Memorial Church) after Frederick III, German Emperor, upon the request of Kleist. It became a separate parish from Altrossgarten Church in 1924. Damaged during the Battle of Königsberg, the church's ruins were demolished by the Soviet Union in the 1980s.
