= Lauth (Königsberg) =

Coordinates: 54°43′59″N 20°35′05″E

Lauth was first a suburb of and then a quarter of Königsberg, Germany, located east of the city center. Its territory is now part of the Guryevsky District, Kaliningrad Oblast, Russia.

The village of Lauth, which contained a large mill, was located east of Liep and Kalthof and north of the Neuer Pregel. Just east of Lauth was the pond Lauther Mühlenteich and the estate Lapsau. Lauth, whose name was of Old Prussian origin, was mentioned as Lauwete in 126 and as Lavtin in 1322.

During the 18th century Lauth was part of Amt Quednau. The fort I Stein, named in 1894, was built near Lauther Mühlenteich as part of the new Königsberg fortifications constructed from 1872 to 1894. Lauth was incorporated into the city of Königsberg in 1939.
