= Liep =

Coordinates: 54°42′14″N 20°33′55″E

Liep was first a suburb of and then a quarter of Königsberg, Germany, located east of the city center. Its territory is now part of the Leningradsky District of Kaliningrad, Russia.

Liep was a medieval fishing village which developed into an estate. Ca. 1327 the Teutonic Knights granted the vicinity to the town of Löbenicht. Documented in 1338 as Lipa, in 1340 as Lypus, and in 1446 as Lieppe, its name was of Old Prussian origin (lipa) and referred to linden trees.

Königsberger Zellstoffabrik A.G., a pulp mill, was built in Liep in 1895 and rapidly expanded in 1897, 1904, and 1906. Liep was incorporated into the city of Königsberg in 1927. Liep was neighbored by the Pregel to the south, Sackheim to the west, Kalthof to the northwest, and Lauth to the northeast.
