= Kaliningrad Central Park =

Park in Kaliningrad, Russia

Coordinates: 54°43′03″N 20°28′40″E

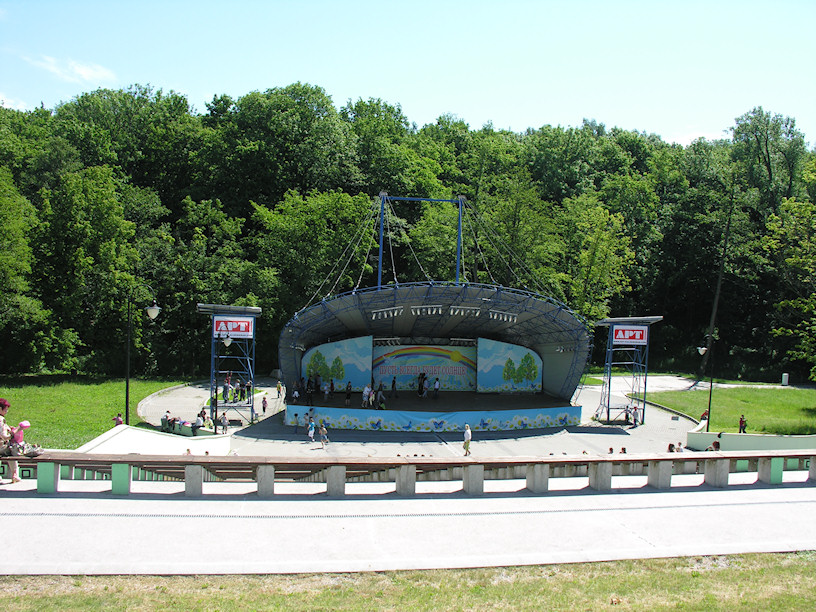
Stage in Kaliningrad Central Park

Kaliningrad Central Park (Russian: Центральный парк Калининграда) is a park in Kaliningrad, Russia. It was known as Luisenwahl while part of Königsberg, Germany, until 1945.

== History ==
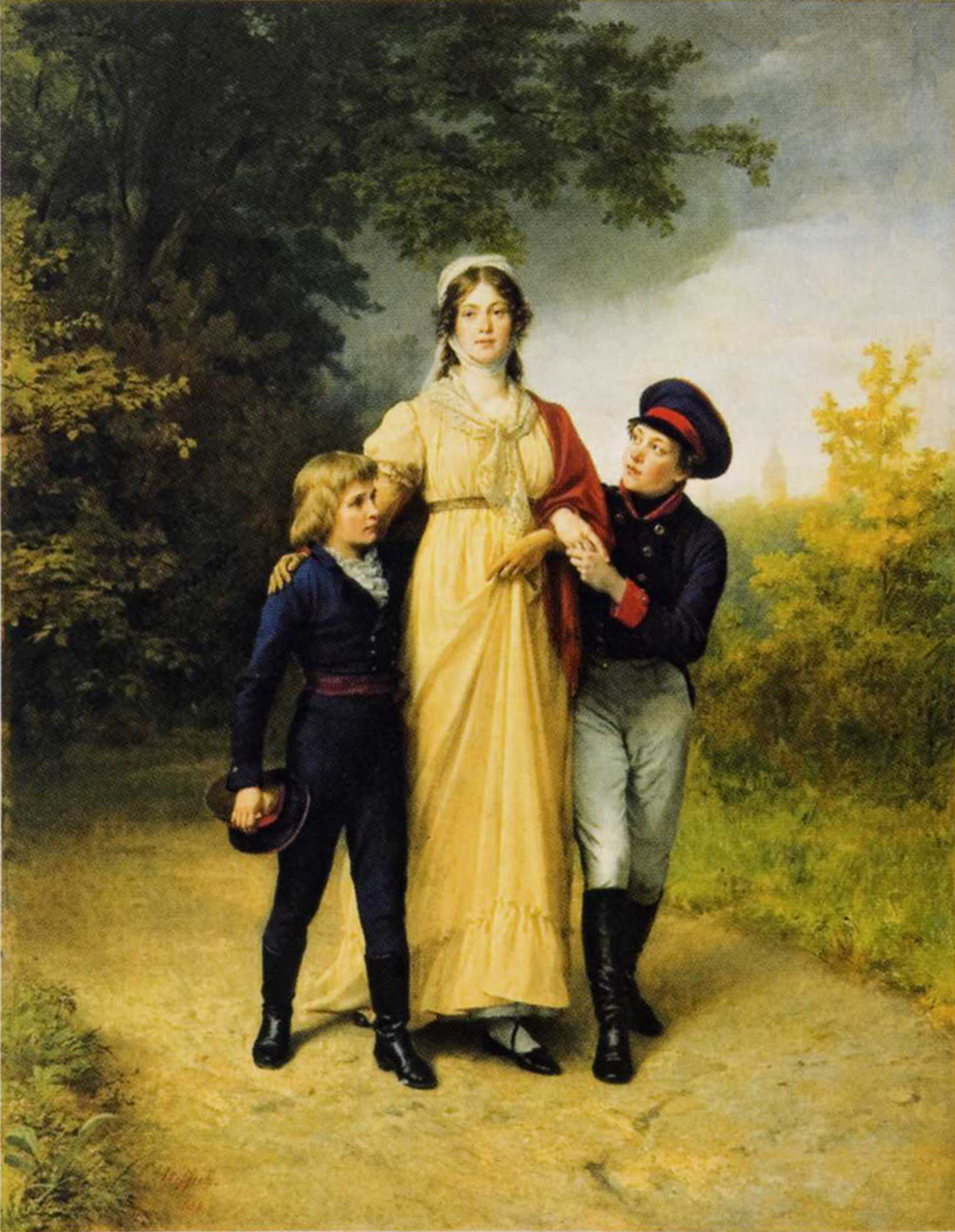
Queen Louise with her sons Frederick William and William in Luisenwahl Park. Painting by Carl Steffeck, 1886.

Luisenwahl was located in the Mittelhufen and Amalienau quarters of northwestern Königsberg. The estate Pojenter was located north of the Alter Pillauer Landstraße at the end of the 18th century. Aside from the manor house and an avenue of linden trees, the estate also contained forges and homes for day laborers. Schmand and Berliner Weisse were produced at the Milchhäuschen building, which was dismantled in 1914.

In 1786 Theodor Gottlieb von Hippel the Elder acquired Pojenter, as well as land extending from the Chausseehaus on the Landstraße to a footpath which later became Hufen-Allee. A decade later the land was purchased by the school official Gotthilf Christoph Wilhelm Busolt, who renamed the park Louisenwahl to honor his wife, Louise (née Gramatzki).

King Frederick William III of Prussia and his wife Louise chose the manor as their summer residence while staying in Königsberg in 1808-09. In 1829 the manor, since renamed the Luisenhaus, was separated from the rest of the park by construction of a road through Hufen to Lawsken.

William I, who had visited the park as a child and again in 1861 during his coronation as King of Prussia, purchased the land in 1872. The Luisendenkmal, a memorial to Queen Louise, was dedicated in 1874 at the highest point of the park; the scenic spot had been favorited by the queen. The Königin-Luise-Gedächtniskirche, now the Kaliningrad Puppet Theatre, was dedicated in the northwestern corner of the park in 1901, the 200th anniversary of the Kingdom of Prussia.

Emperor William II granted the park to the city of Königsberg in 1914. A stele by Walter Rosenberg honoring Franz Schubert was unveiled at a small amphitheatre in the park in 1928. The harsh winter of 1929/30 froze the fruit orchard on the hills of Luisenwahl; children subsequently used it for tobogganing.

The park was transferred from Germany to the Soviet Union following World War II in 1945. The Soviet administration expanded it with land from nearby cemeteries and renamed it after Mikhail Kalinin. Now known as Kaliningrad Central Park, it contains monuments of Baron Munchausen and Vladimir Vysotsky, as well some pre-war German architecture.

The park administration is located in the building of the former Rominten Hunting Lodge, which was moved from the Rominter Heath to the park.

== Gallery ==
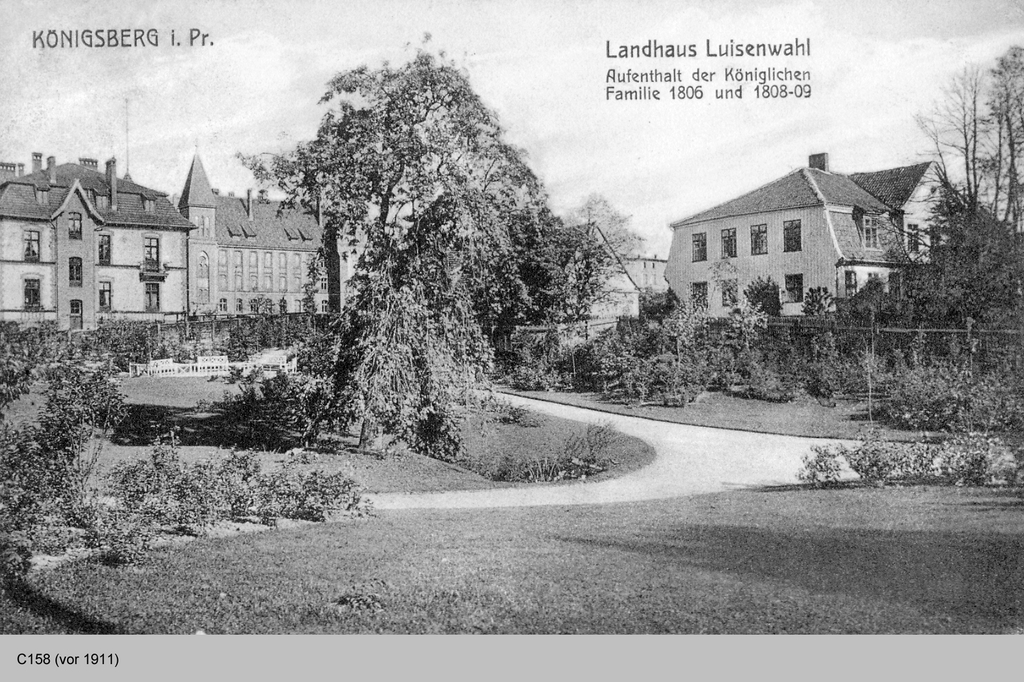
Luisenhaus

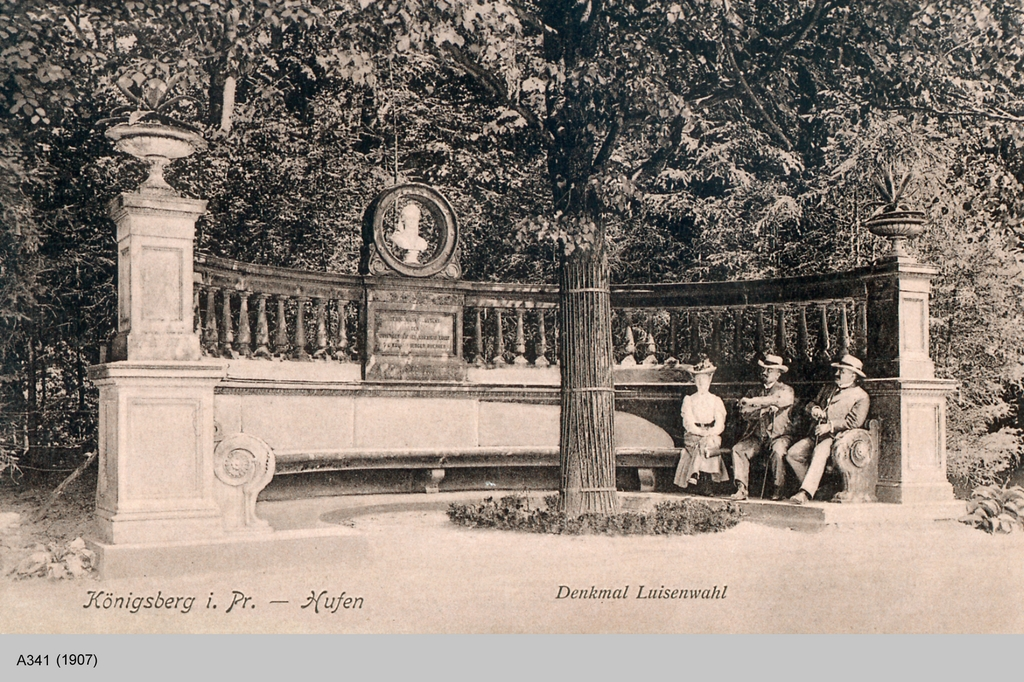
Luisendenkmal

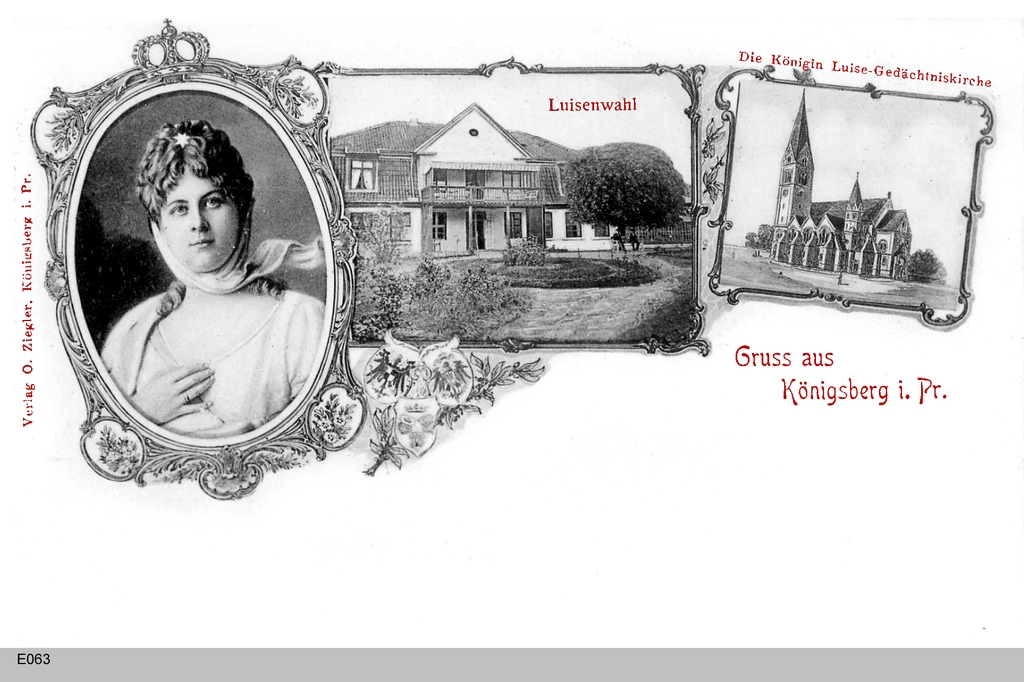
Sights in Luisenwahl
