= Chkalovsk Microdistrict =

Residential area in Kaliningrad, Russia

Coordinates: 54°46′N 20°27′E

Chkalovsk (Russian: Чкаловск) is a residential area in Tsentralny District of Kaliningrad, Russia. It was formerly known by its German name Tannenwalde as first a suburban estate and then a quarter of northwestern Königsberg, Germany.

== History ==
Tannenwalde was first documented in 1807. The fort V König Friedrich Wilhelm III., named in 1894, was built near Tannenwalde as part of the new Königsberg fortifications constructed from 1872 to 1894.

The estate of Tannenwalde, which contained a brickyard, developed into a garden town suburb of Königsberg in the 1920s. Its parish chapel became independent in 1930. Nazi Germany's air force, the Luftwaffe, constructed an air base nearby in 1935. Tannenwalde was incorporated into Königsberg in 1939. The quarter of Charlottenburg lay to the southeast.

Königsberg was transferred to Soviet control in 1945 after World War II. In 1948 Tannenwalde was renamed Chkalovsk, after the pilot Valery Chkalov. It contains Kaliningrad Chkalovsk air base.
