= Hufengymnasium =

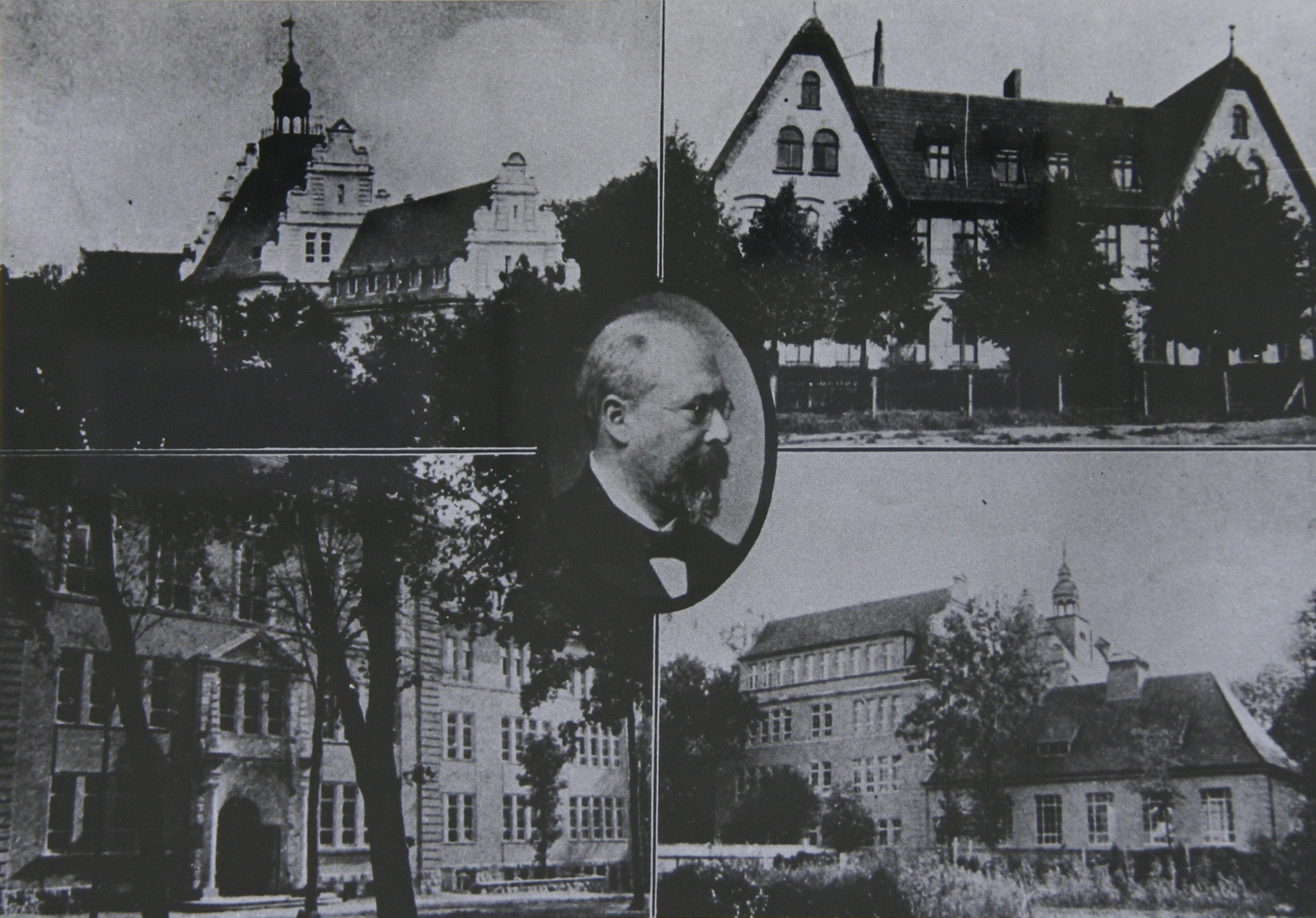
Postcard of the Hufengymnasium and Harry Brettschneider

The Hufengymnasium or Hufen-Gymnasium was a gymnasium in the Hufen quarter of Königsberg, Germany.

== History ==
Because of the rapid growth of Hufen and Amalienau in turn of the century Königsberg, a new school was needed for the growing population. The school opened on 1 May 1905 in a leased building on Hermann-Allee near the Tiergarten. It was originally known as the Königliches (royal) Hufengymnasium, as Königsberg was part of the Kingdom of Prussia at that time. Its first director was Otto Portzehl (1860-1945). In 1907 it became a Reformgymnasium, with an emphasis on learning foreign languages other than Latin. Concurrently, it received a new director, Harry Brettschneider (1854-1934), who stayed until 1921 and was praised for his methods of teaching history.

The school moved to a new neoclassical building on Tiergartenstraße near Hufen-Allee, constructed from 1913 to 1915 and dedicated in 1915. It contained 18 classes, half with a humanistic approach and half with a scientific focus. It was led from 1922 to 1934 by Alfred Postelmann (1880-1945), who would be killed by a bomb in Pillau in 1945. Notable teachers included Ernst Wiechert and Emil Stumpp.

The school was heavily damaged in 1944 during the bombing of Königsberg in World War II and classes ceased on 21 August 1945. It was rebuilt in Soviet Kaliningrad after the war and was reopened as a construction engineering school on 1 September 1958.

== Notable students ==
- Hannah Arendt (1906-1974), historians & philosopher [enrolled as an extern, 1921-1922]
- Andreas Hillgruber (1925-1989), historian
- Theodor Kaluza (1910-1994), mathematician
- Karl William Kapp (1910-1976), economist
- Erwin Kroll (1886-1976), music critic
- Kurt Sanderling (1912-2011), conductor
- Heinz Sielmann (1917-2006), zoologist
