= Beydritten =

German suburban estate in Königsberg

Beydritten was first a suburban estate and then a quarter of Königsberg, Germany, located north of the city center. Its territory is now part of the Leningradsky District of Kaliningrad, Russia.

The estate of Beydritten was situated north of the Ringchaussee and Ballieth and west of Quednau. Documented in 1389 as Bayderithen, its name was of Old Prussian origin and referred to a personal name. The estate had its own school. The fort IV Geisenau, named in 1894, was built near Beydritten as part of the new Königsberg fortifications constructed from 1872 to 1894. Beydritten was incorporated into the city of Königsberg in April 1939.
