= Kaliningrad Puppet Theatre =

Puppet theatre in Kaliningrad, Russia

Coordinates: 54°43′10″N 20°28′33″E

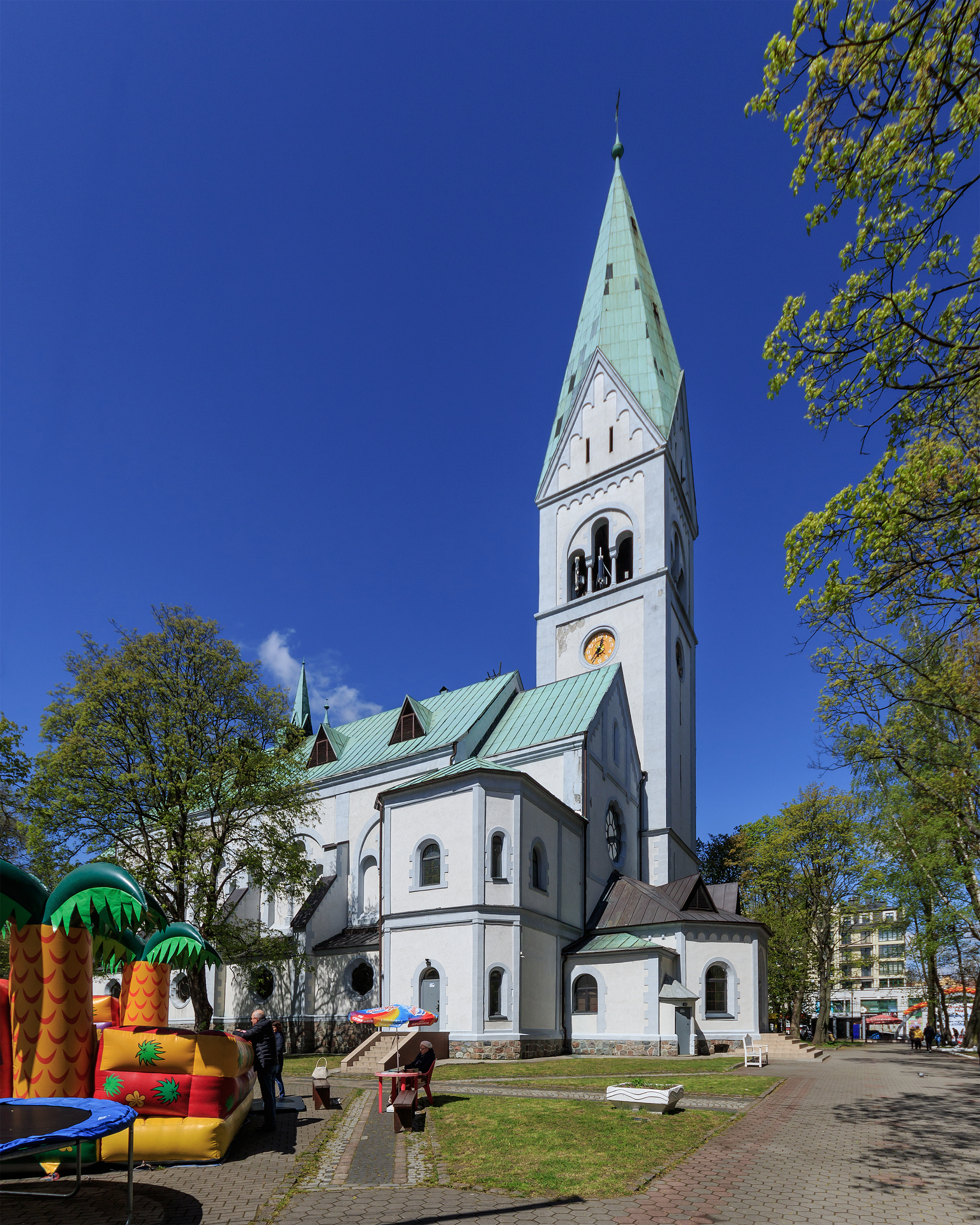
Kaliningrad Puppet Theatre, formerly the Luisenkirche

The Kaliningrad Puppet Theatre (Russian: Калининградский кукольный театр) is a puppet theatre in Kaliningrad, Russia. The building was originally the Königin-Luise-Gedächtniskirche (Queen Louise Memorial Church), popularly known as the Luisenkirche, a Protestant church in Königsberg, Germany.

== History ==
The Luisenkirche, the first church to be built outside the Königsberg city walls, was named in honour of Queen Louise of Prussia (1776–1810), who was beloved by Königsbergers. Land and funds were donated primarily by the leading tobacco manufacturer Louis Großkopf and his wife, with additional funding coming from the banker and philanthropist Walter Simon, the industrialist Fritz Heumann, and A. Siebert.

The Neo-Romanesque building was designed by the architects Friedrich Heitmann and Franz Krah to serve the residential suburbs of Amalienau, Mittelhufen, and Vorderhufen. Constructed in Amalienau between 1899 and 1901 and dedicated on 9 September 1901, the church was heavily damaged during World War II.

Königsberg became the Soviet city of Kaliningrad after the war, and the Soviet authorities planned to demolish the ruins in the 1960s. However, the architect Yuri Vaganov convinced officials that the building could be converted into a puppet theatre. Renovations were completed in 1976. While the exterior of the building has largely retained its pre-war appearance, the interior has been redesigned to fit the needs of a theatre.

== Gallery ==
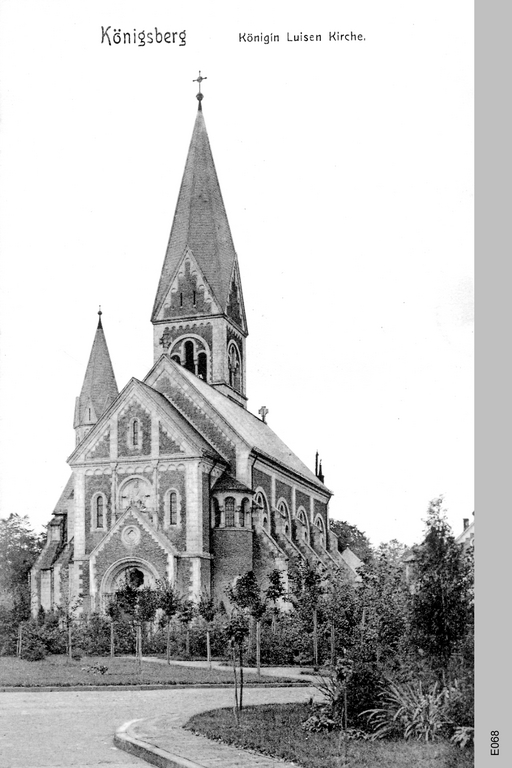
Luisenkirche

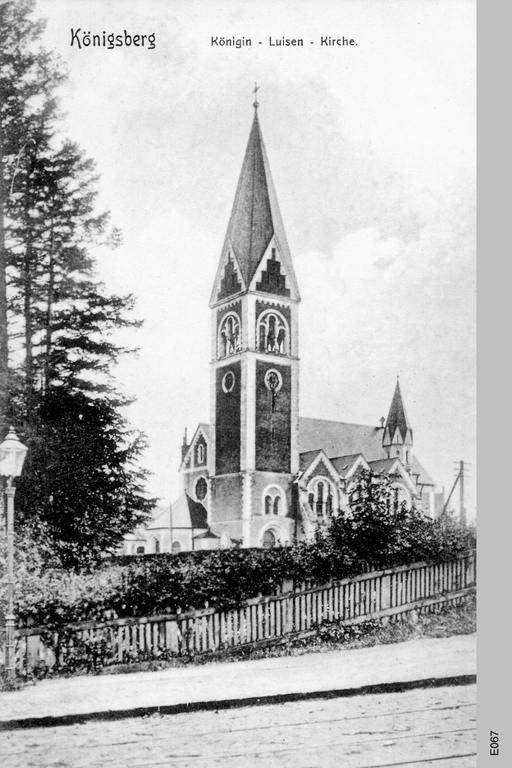
Luisenkirche
