= Hardershof =

Hardershof was a suburban estate and then a quarter of northern Königsberg, Germany. Its territory is now part of the Tsentralny District of Kaliningrad, Russia.

== History ==
Hardershof was first documented in 1822 as Georg Harders Hof just north of Hufen. Königsberg's waterworks was constructed in Hardershof in the 1870s. The estate was developed by the Terrain-Aktiengesellschaft Tiepolt ca. 1900. In 1909 a school for the blind was built in Hardershof by Wilhelm Varrentrapp. Hardershof also contained a radio station for the weather service and, since 1931, a public bath.

Hardershof, along with the rest of Hufen, was incorporated into the city of Königsberg by 1908. Other quarters of Königsberg near Hardershof were Mittelhufen to the southwest, Vorderhufen to the southeast, Tragheimer Palve to the east, Ballieth to the northeast, and Charlottenburg to the northwest.
