= Walter Simon (philanthropist) =

German banker, councillor and philanthropist (1857–1920)

Walter Simon (30 April 1857, Königsberg – 1 April 1920) was a German banker, councillor and philanthropist active in Königsberg and Tübingen.

== Life ==
Simon, the second son of Königsberg banker Moritz Simon and Hedwig Simon, attended Altstadt Gymnasium as a youth and then studied law, medicine, and philosophy at the University of Tübingen and the Albertina, the University of Königsberg. After graduation he worked as a banker in his native Königsberg. Until 1 April 1901 he was also a city councillor, focusing on relief for the poor and public education.

Simon received an honorary professorship from the Albertina in 1899 and was accorded a Geheime Kommerzienrat (privy commerce councilor) of the German Empire. Simon was also named an honorary citizen of Königsberg in 1908, during the centennial of the 1808 reforming Städteordnung of Stein. Simon died at his home on Copernicusstraße in Neuroßgarten in 1920.

== Philanthropy ==
=== Königsberg ===
In 1892 Simon granted 6.83 hectares in Mittelhufen for the construction of the athletic field Walter-Simon-Platz, which hosted Königsberger STV in the early 20th century. Renamed Erich-Koch-Platz during Nazi Germany because Simon was Jewish, the field is now Baltika Stadium in Kaliningrad, Russia. In 1894 Simon sponsored a public bath with free instruction for schoolchildren along the Oberteich. He donated funds for books and construction of the Luisenkirche in Amalienau, the Farenheid Poorhouse in Hinterroßgarten, and the Bismarck Memorial at Kaiser-Wilhelm-Platz.

=== Tübingen ===
Simon founded the Dr. Walter-Simon-Stiftung für Tübinger Weingärtner, an endowment for Tübingen winemakers, in 1890. He also established an endowment for female university students in 1907. He donated further funds in 1932 after his initial endowment was diminished through inflation. In 1912 Simon started an endowment for petty bourgeoisie couples, especially brides. Additionally, he donated to the Uhlandbad indoor swimming pool. The street Walter-Simon-Straße in Tübingen is named in his honor.
