= Mittelhufen =

Coordinates: 54.7284°N 20.4826°E

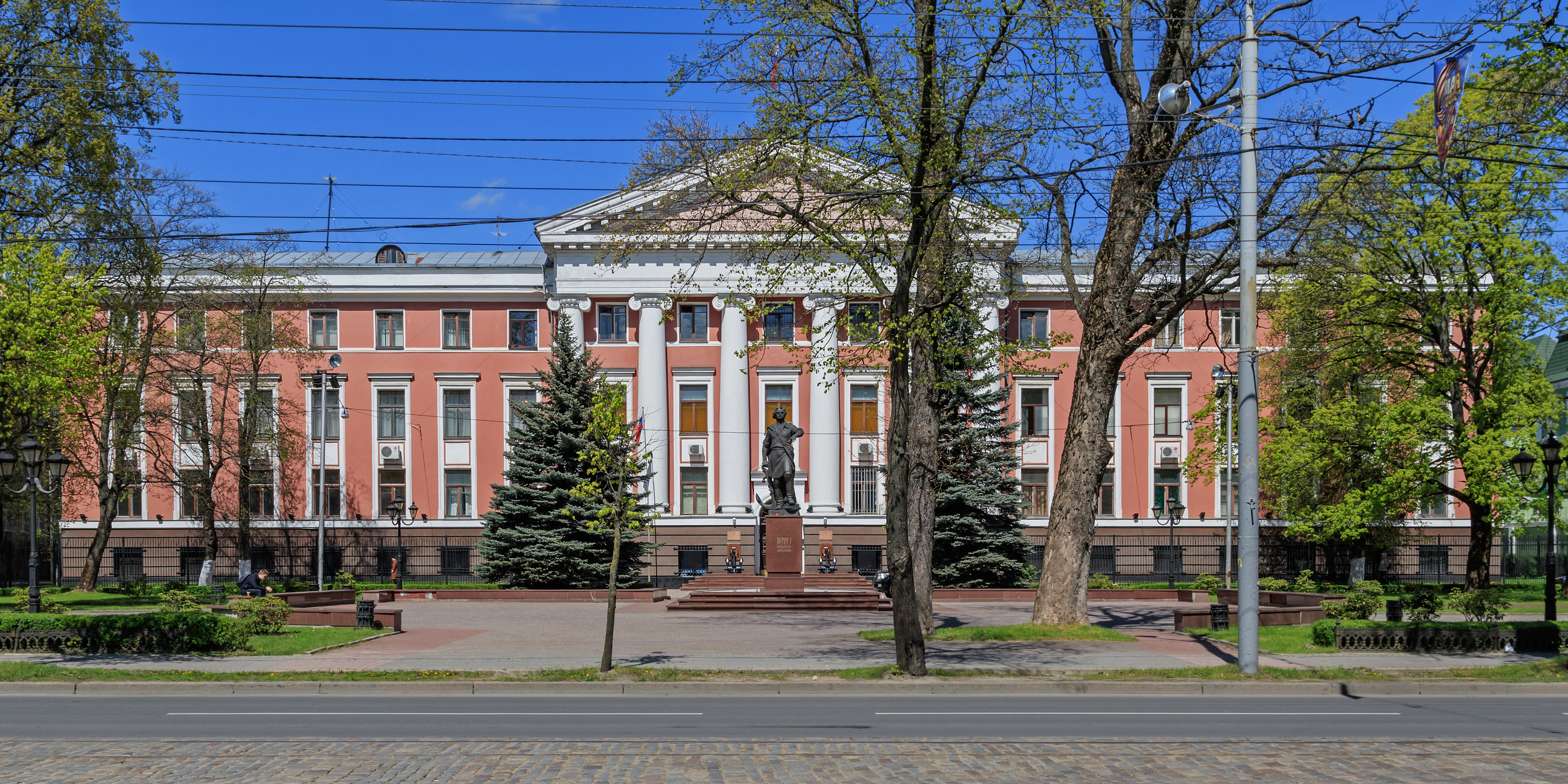
Baltic Fleet headquarters in Kaliningrad, formerly Königsberg's postal headquarters

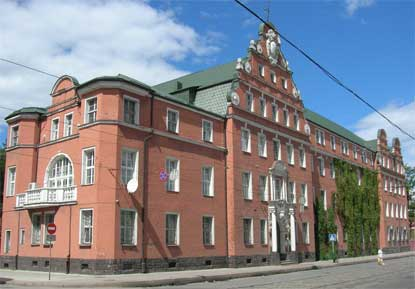
FSB office, formerly Königsberg's police headquarters

Mittelhufen was a suburban quarter of northwestern Königsberg, Germany. Its territory is now part of the Tsentralny District of Kaliningrad, Russia.

== History ==
Mittelhufen was originally a village in the central part of the Hufen region extending north and west of the 17th century Baroque city walls. Many upper class estates developed in Mittelhufen during the 19th century. The estate Albrechtshöh was named after the Amtmann ("bailiff") Karl Albrecht in 1828; after Albrecht's death in 1840 the Villa Albrechtshöhe, later known as Luisenhöh, was separated from the estate. The estate Kohlhof was named after the justice commissioner Kohlhoff, while the estate Hardershof was documented in 1822 as Georg Harders Hof.

The villa suburb of Mittelhufen was incorporated into Königsberg on 1 April 1905. Neighboring quarters were Amalienau to the west, Hardershof to the north, Vorderhufen to the east, and Steindamm and Neurossgarten to the southeast.

Hufen-Park was located in northeastern Mittelhufen on both sides of the scenic Hufen-Freigrabenschlucht. This stream and gully proceeded from eastern Hufen-Park through the Luisenwahl, then turned south and entered the Pregel River at Kosse. Königsberg's zoo, the Tiergarten, opened in Hufen-Park in 1896. Located south of the zoo was the East Prussian open-air museum (1912-38) and the new Hufengymnasium (dedicated 1915). Along Hindenburgstraße was the Hufen-Oberlyzeum, a women's gymnasium.

The road Hansaring connected Hufenallee with Hansaplatz near Steindamm. Local institutions included the Neues Schauspielhaus, Oberpostdirektion (postal headquarters, now the Baltic Fleet headquarters), Prussian State Archive, and combined Amtsgericht and Landgerichte (now Kaliningrad State Technical University). Also nearby was the city's Polizeipräsidium (police headquarters, now used by the FSB).

The football club Königsberger STV played its home games at southern Mittelhufen's Walter-Simon-Platz (now Baltika Stadium), named after the philanthropist Walter Simon, who donated the land in 1892. In 1933 the field was renamed Erich-Koch-Platz, after the Nazi Gauleiter. The football club Rasensport-Preußen Königsberg was based out of Sportplatz Rasensport Preußen on Stresemannstraße (also known as Fuchsberger Allee and General-Litzmann-Straße) in the outskirts of northern Mittelhufen.
