= Ballieth =

Ballieth was first a suburban estate and then a quarter of Königsberg, Germany, located north of the city center. Its territory is now part of the Leningradsky District of Kaliningrad, Russia.

Ballieth was situated on the road Samitter Allee, which ran north–south. Neighboring quarters were Tragheimer Palve to the south, Hardershof to the southwest, Charlottenburg to the west, Beydritten to the north, Quednau to the east, and Maraunenhof to the southeast. Due east of the estate was Max Aschmann Park. Development of the suburb intensified during the 1920s. Ballieth was incorporated into the city of Königsberg in 1928.
