= Lermontovo Microdistrict =

Residential area in Kaliningrad, Russia

Lermontovo (Russian: Лермонтово) is a residential area in Tsentralny Administrative District, Kaliningrad, Russia. It was formerly known by its German name Charlottenburg first as a suburban estate and then as part of northwestern Königsberg, Germany.

== History ==
Charlottenburg was located northwest of Hufen and Hardershof, west of Ballieth, and southeast of Tannenwalde. Sophia Charlotte was the queen-consort of Frederick I, the first King in Prussia. Molded bricks for the construction of the University of Königsberg's new campus came from a pottery factory near Charlottenburg. It developed into a residential garden town suburb of Königsberg in the first half of the 20th century. Charlottenburg was incorporated into the city of Königsberg in 1939.

Königsberg was transferred to Soviet control in 1945 after World War II. Königsberg was subsequently renamed as Kaliningrad and Charlottenburg as Lermontovo after Mikhail Lermontov.
