= Vorderhufen =

Vorderhufen was a quarter of northern Königsberg, Germany. Its territory is now part of the Tsentralny District of Kaliningrad, Russia.

== History ==
Vorderhufen ("near Hufen") was originally a village in the eastern part of the Hufen region extending north and west of the 17th century Baroque city walls. At the beginning of the 18th century Vorderhufen was only lightly settled because of its position on the road to Cranz. The upper class estates of Vorderhufen disappeared during the 19th century, with most of them purchased by the military treasury in the 1840s to allow construction of new fortifications for Königsberg.

Vorderhufen was incorporated into the city of Königsberg on 1 April 1905. Neighboring quarters were Mittelhufen to the west, Steindamm to the south, Tragheim to the southeast, Tragheimsdorf to the east, Tragheimer Palve to the northeast, and Hardershof to the north.

Located in Vorderhufen were the northern train station (the Nordbahnhof), a goods station, and the offices of the Samlandbahn railway. Institutions in the quarter included the Chamber of Agriculture (Landwirtschaftskammer), and the Neues Schützenhaus of the Schützenverein. The Ostpreußische Mädchengewerbeschule was located in a section of Vorderhufen called the Musikerviertel (musicians' quarter), as several roads were named after composers (e.g., Bach, Beethoven, Mozart). The trade fair Ostmesse was located between Vorderhufen and Tragheim.
