= Tragheimer Palve =

Tragheimer Palve was first a suburb of and then a quarter of northern Königsberg, Germany. Its territory is now part of the Leningradsky District of Kaliningrad, Russia.

Named after the Old Prussian village Tragheim, Tragheimer Palve was once an unfruitful heath (Palve in the Old Prussian language). By 1618 it contained a paper mill. The suburb was incorporated into Königsberg by 1908. It began to be developed during the era of the Weimar Republic. Tragheimer Palve was bordered by Tragheimsdorf to the south, Maraunenhof to the east, Ballieth to the north, Hardershof to the west, and Vorderhufen to the southwest. Its main thoroughfare was Samitter Allee, renamed General Litzmann Straße by the Nazi Party.

Located along Samitter Allee between Tragheimer Palve and Tragheimsdorf was the Dr. Friedrich-Lange-Platz, a stadium named after Dr. Friedrich Lange in 1931. It was originally built as the Palästra-Sportplatz by the Palästra Albertina in 1914. SpVgg ASCO Königsberg and its predecessor clubs were based out of the stadium from 1919 until 1926.
