= Ostpreußische Mädchengewerbeschule =

Former German girls' vocational school

Coordinates: 54°43′27″N 20°29′45″E

The Ostpreußische Mädchengewerbeschule or Ostpreussische Mädchengewerbeschule was a girls' vocational school in Königsberg, the capital of East Prussia, Germany.

== Context ==
In East Prussia the concept Gewerbeschule stems from Christian Peter Wilhelm Beuth opening the Gewerbeinstitut zur Industrieförderung (commercial institute for the advancement of industry) which he called a "Gewerbeschule". It took youngsters in their final three years of secondary education (from 12 to 16). It trained the students in geometry, arithmetic, physics, chemistry, technical- and freehand drawing, trigonometry, statics, mechanics and engineering. On completion, the youngsters could find work in engineering, the textile and chemical industries or move onto further education. In other parts of Germany the word had a different meaning.

== History ==
The school opened in 1909 on Kasernenstraße between the Burgkirche and Roßgärter Markt. Its first director was Dr. Gertrud Brostowski, followed by Marie Gosse in 1912. By 1928 it included 1,208 students.

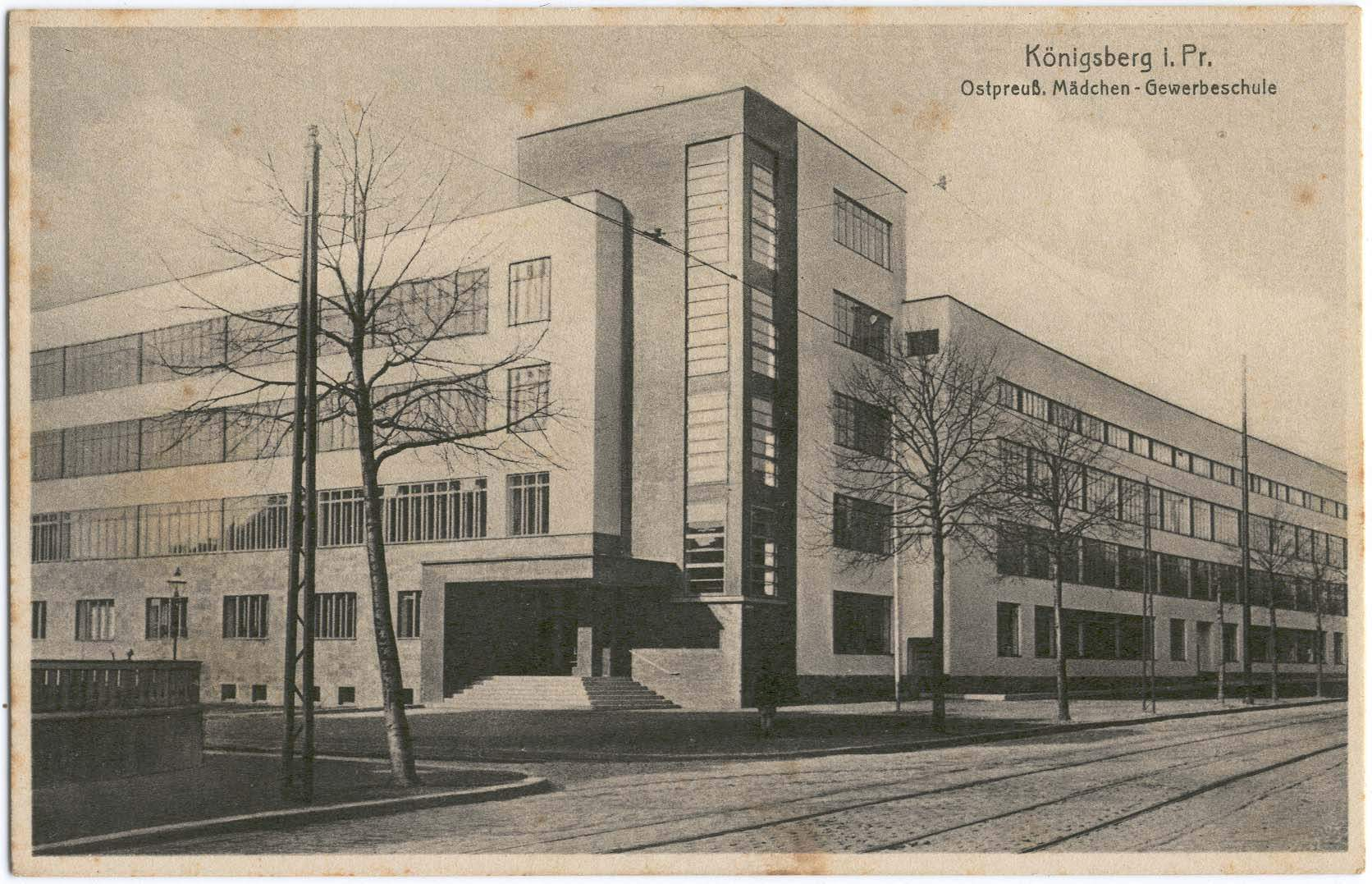
New building of school, 1930s

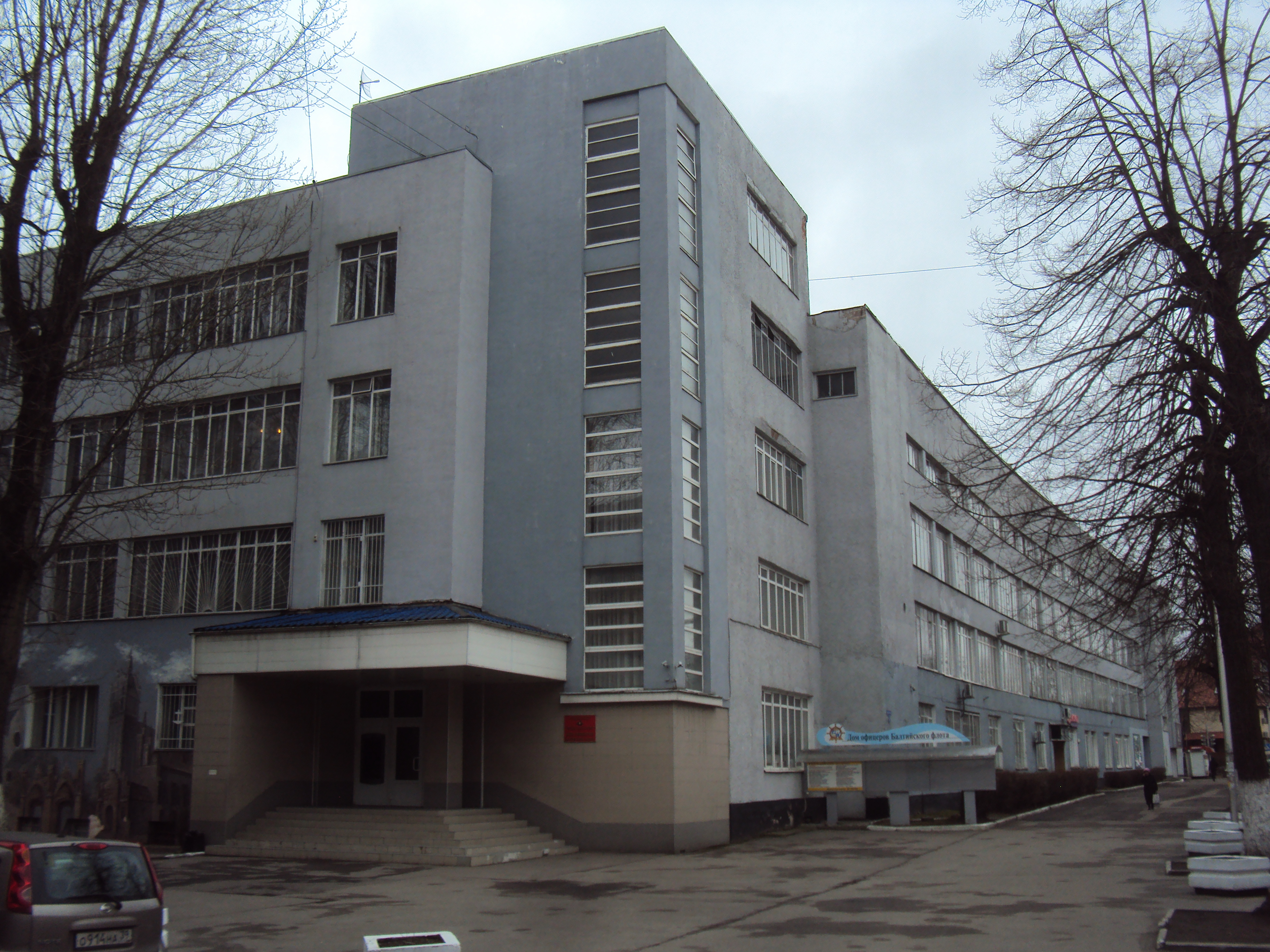
Former school building. House of Officers of the Baltic Fleet, 2016

In 1930 the Mädchengewerbeschule moved to a new building on Beethovenstraße and Loewestraße in Vorderhufen. The new school, which cost 2,092,000 or 2,245,000 RM, was designed by Hanns Hopp and Georg Lucas in the Bauhaus style and constructed from 1928 to 1930. It contained classrooms for chemistry, physics, cooking, and drawing, a gym, offices, a small boarding school, and living quarters for the director and teachers. It was colloquially known as the "Mädchenaquarium" (girls' aquarium) and "Klopsakademie". The new Mädchengewerbeschule and the Haus der Technik were the greatest works of Hopp during the 1920s.

The building survived the destruction of Königsberg during World War II and is now used as an officers' club in Kaliningrad, Russia. Its gym was also converted into a discothèque.
