= Prussian State Archive Königsberg =

Coordinates: 54.7193°N 20.4940°E

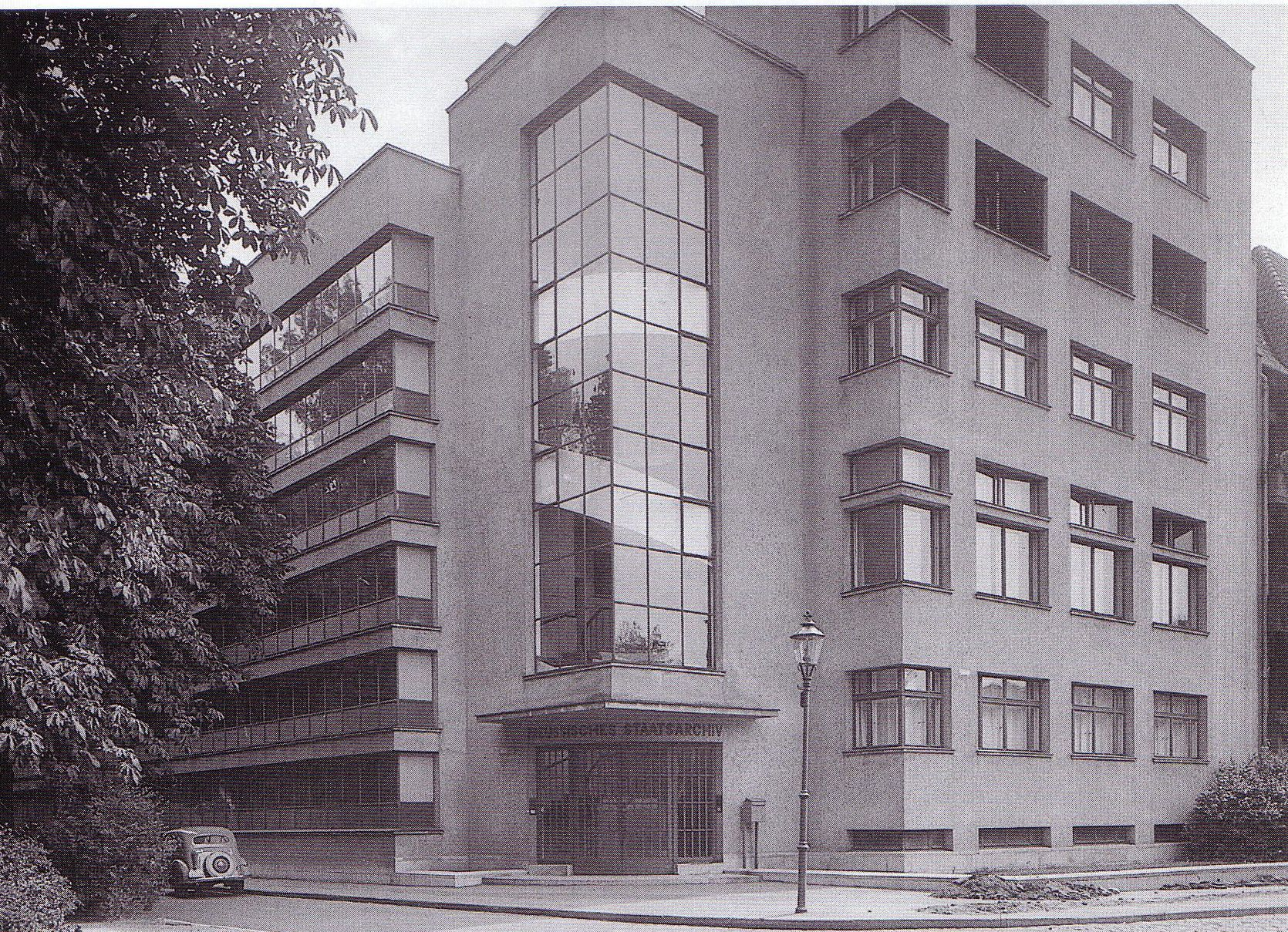
Prussian State Archive in Mittelhufen

The Prussian State Archive Königsberg (German: Preußisches Staatsarchiv Königsberg) was an archive in Königsberg, Germany. It consisted of documents from the state of the Teutonic Order, the Duchy of Prussia, and East Prussia. Most of it is now part of the Prussian Privy State Archives in Berlin-Dahlem.

== History ==
For centuries the archive was held in the oldest part of Königsberg Castle, the western north wing. Documents were stored in oak drawers from the Teutonic era. In 1810 it became supported by the Oberpräsident of East Prussia. The first scientific archivists were Karl Faber and Ernst Hennig. Other archivists included Friedrich Adolf Meckelburg, Rudolf Philippi, Erich Joachim, Hermann Ehrenburg, and Paul Karge. The archive moved to a new building at Hansaring in Mittelhufen, constructed by Robert Liebenthal from 1929 to 1930. The last director of the archive was Dr. Max Hein.

Most of the collection, including its most valuable documents, were evacuated from Königsberg before the end of World War II and stored in a salt mine at Grasleben. Troops in the British occupation zone then brought them to the Imperial Palace of Goslar. From 1953 to 1979 the collection was stored in Göttingen.

The evacuated Königsberg collection, about 85% of the pre-war documents, has been in the possession of the Prussian Privy State Archives in Berlin since 1979. It consists of almost complete collections from the Teutonic and ducal eras. There are numerous documents from the 18th century, but fewer from the 19th and 20th centuries. Other documents from the original collection which were not evacuated are in the possession of the Archiwum Państwowe w Olsztynie in Olsztyn, the Wroblewski Library of the Lithuanian Academy of Sciences and Lithuanian Central State Archives in Vilnius, and the Gosudarstvennyj Archiv Kaliningradskoj Oblasti in Kaliningrad. Liebenthal's archive in former Königsberg is now a scientific library in Kaliningrad.
