= Kaliningrad Chkalovsk =

Navy air base in Chkalovsk, Russia

Kaliningrad Chkalovsk
- Чкаловск
- Chkalovsk, Kaliningrad Oblast in Russia
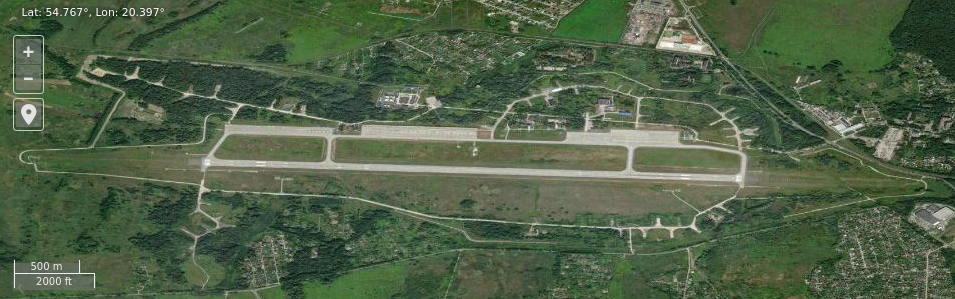
- Satellite imagery of Kaliningrad Chkalovsk naval air base

Site information
- Type: Air Base
- Owner: Ministry of Defence
- Operator: Russian Navy - Russian Naval Aviation
- Controlled by: Baltic Fleet

Location
- Shown within Kaliningrad Oblast Chkalovsk (Russia)
- Coordinates: 54°46′0″N 20°23′48″E

Site history
- Built: 1935
- In use: 1935 - present

Airfield information
- Elevation: 50 metres (164 ft) AMSL
Runways
Direction	Length and surface
09/27	3,100 metres (10,171 ft) Concrete

Kaliningrad Chkalovsk (also Chkalovskoye, Tchalov, or Prowehren) is a naval air base in Chkalovsk, Kaliningrad Oblast, Russia located 9 kilometers northwest of Kaliningrad. Most instances in Russian aviation literature of Chkalovsk or Chkalovskoye refer specifically to this large airfield. A significant Baltic naval base, it is Kaliningrad's largest airfield with four separate complexes for bomber and fighter parking.

The base is home to the 689th Guards Fighter Regiment which uses the Sukhoi Su-27P/UP (ASCC: Flanker) as part of the 132nd Composite Aviation Division as part of the Baltic Fleet.

== History ==
The construction of a military airbase began in 1935, the German Luftwaffe started to operate the ″Fliegerhorst Prowehren″ in 1936. In 1943 a concrete runway was built.

Following World War II the area was annexed by the Soviet Union and the airbase was taken over by the Red Army. Chkalovsk began receiving Tupolev Tu-22 (Blinder) aircraft around 1963 and by 1967 had 30 aircraft. It was one of nine major operating locations for the Tupolev Tu-22 Blinders. Tupolev Tu-16 (Badger) aircraft also operated from Chkalovsk frequently during the 1960s.

On December 24, 1964, a Tu-22R jumped its wheel chocks during a ground run and hit three parked aircraft; all were written off. In August 1966, a Tu-22 made a runway excursion while landing, destroying itself and a parked aircraft. The Tu-22 aircraft were transferred to Zyabrovka in 1992 as the unit re-equipped with Sukhoi Su-24MR. High-resolution Google Earth imagery shows the base is still active, with Sukhoi Su-27 aircraft on the ramp, a transport aircraft, and some helicopters. Some Tu-22M (Backfire) appear to be stored.

Historic Google Earth imagery shows that the runway, all taxiways and aprons of Chkalovsk air base were fully renovated and the area of aprons also extensively enlarged during 2013–2014.

Chkalovsk was home to 846 OMSHAP (846th Independent Naval Aviation Regiment) flying 44 Sukhoi Su-17 aircraft in 1992; and 15 ODRAP (15th Independent Long-Range Reconnaissance Aviation Regiment) flying 30 Tu-22 aircraft from 1966 to 1982 and 12 Su-24 aircraft by the 1990s.

Scramble reports that 689th Guards Fighter Aviation Regiment (see ru:689-й гвардейский истребительный авиационный полк, Su-27s) & 288 OVP based at Nivenskoye moved to Chkalovsk during August 2002.

In August 2022, Russia’s Defense Ministry said three MiG-31 fighters fitted for Kh-47M2 Kinzhal hypersonic missiles arrived at the base as part of “additional measures of strategic deterrence”. Russia said the aircraft would be on 24/7 alert. The missiles were not fitted when the planes flew in, indicating these were transported separately.

== See also ==
- List of military airbases in Russia
