= Baltika Stadium =

Football stadium in Kaliningrad, Russia

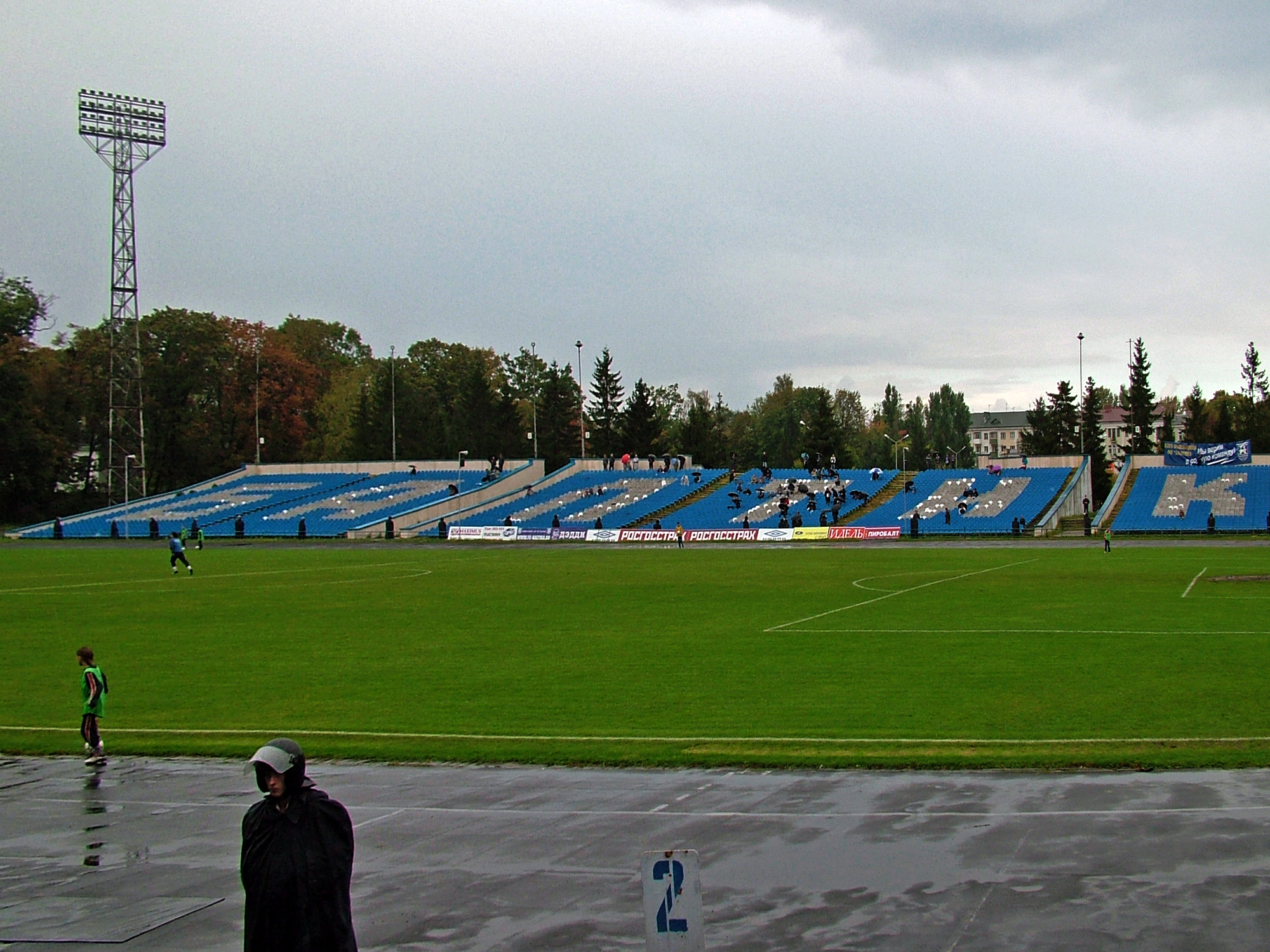
- Baltika Stadium in 2007
- Interactive map of Baltika Stadium
- Location: Kaliningrad, Russia
- Coordinates: 54°43′01.69″N 20°29′25.58″E
- Capacity: 4,500 (2021–present); 14,660 (football) (–2018)
- Surface: Artificial turf

Construction
- Renovated: 2018–2021

Tenants
- FC Baltika Kaliningrad (1954–2018); FC Baltika-2 Kaliningrad (2021–)

Baltika Stadium (Russian: Балтика стадион, Baltika Stadion) is a multi-purpose stadium in Kaliningrad, Russia, that was home to FC Baltika Kaliningrad. The capacity of the stadium used to be 14,660 before the 2018 renovation, but is now reduced to 4,500.

== History ==
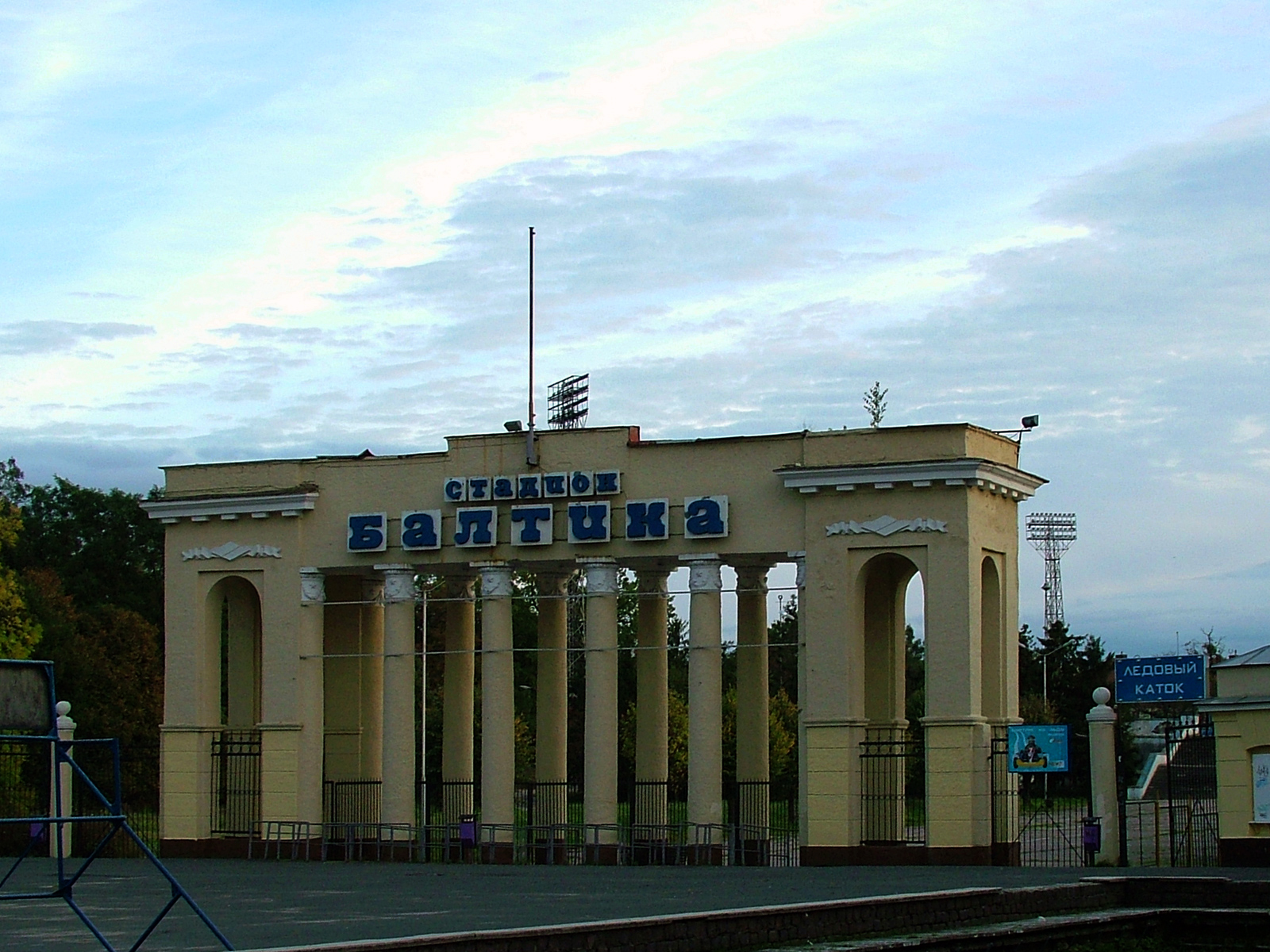
Entrance of the stadium

The stadium was originally within Königsberg, Germany. In 1892 philanthropist Walter Simon granted 6.83 hectares in Mittelhufen for the construction of an athletic field. Named Walter-Simon-Platz in his honor, the stadium hosted Königsberger STV in the early 20th century. The Yorck memorial was constructed near it in 1913.

Because Simon was Jewish, the Nazi Party renamed the stadium Erich-Koch-Platz after Gauleiter Erich Koch in 1933. The city became Russian after World War II. Columns from the portico of New Altstadt Church are included in Baltika Stadium's entrance.

After Baltika left for the Kaliningrad Stadium, stadium was retrofitted and reduced in capacity. All newer stands were removed and the place converted into sport fields for other activities. Artificial pitch was installed.
