= St. Adalbert's Church, Königsberg =

Church in Kaliningrad, Russia

- Adalberts-kirche
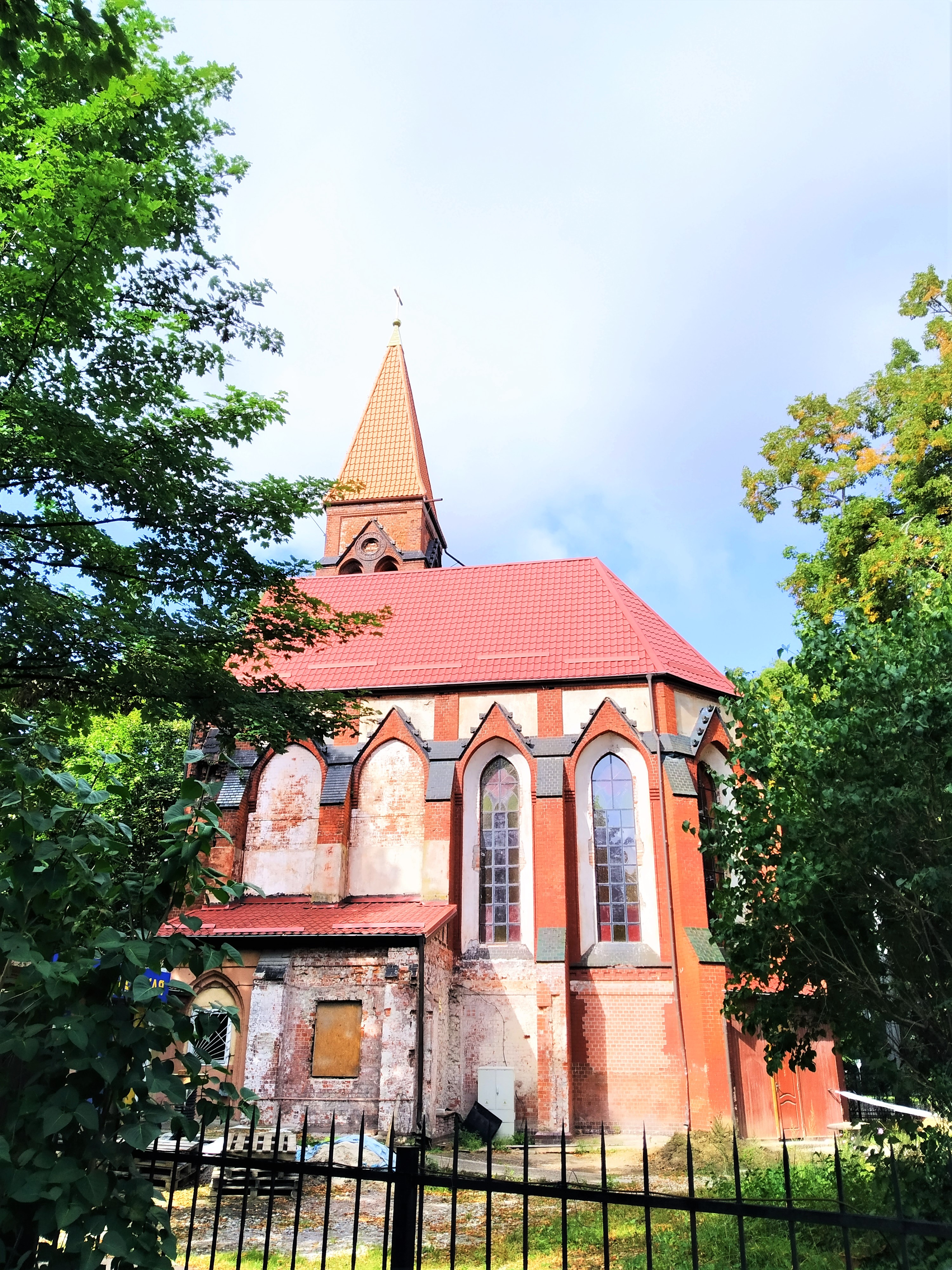
- St, Adalberts church before the end of restoration, 2020.
- St. Adalbert's Church, Königsberg
- 54°42′53″N 20°27′56″E
- Denomination: Russian Orthodox
- Previous denomination: Roman Catholic

History
- Dedication: St. Adalbert, Archangel Michael
- Consecrated: 14.November 1904, 21.November 2023

Architecture
- Architect: Friedrich Heitmann
- Style: Neo-Gothic
- Years built: 1902-1904
- Groundbreaking: 16. July 1902

St. Adalbert's Church (German: Adalberts-Kirche; Russian: Кирха Святого Адальберта) is a former Roman Catholic church in western Königsberg, Amalienau suburb, Germany, modern day Kaliningrad. It is now used by the Russian Orthodox Church.

== History ==
The Königsberg suburb of Amalienau began to grow rapidly at the start of the 20th century. Construction of a small Neo-Gothic chapel on Lawsker Allee began on 16 July 1902 according to plans by Friedrich Heitmann, with its dedication occurring on 14 November 1904. It was expanded in 1932, and Adalbert of Prague was named as patron saint. Heitmann was buried in the church cemetery in 1921.

Aside from its steeple, the church was not heavily damaged during the 1945 Battle of Königsberg. The Soviet administration in Kaliningrad dismantled an extension of the church and the remainder was used by a manufacturing company. From 1975 to 2018 it was used by the IZMIRAN institute in Kaliningrad, Russia. The church was handed over to the Russian Orthodox church, despite pleas from the Catholic church. The churches restoration started in 2019, which included rebuilding the destroyed spire and installing stained glass windows. In October 2022 major restoration works started in the interior of the church and the restoration of the churches facade started. On 28. February 2023, the restoration was completed.

The first Orthodox service was held in the church, that is now dedicated to the archangel Michael, on November 21, 2023.

== Gallery ==
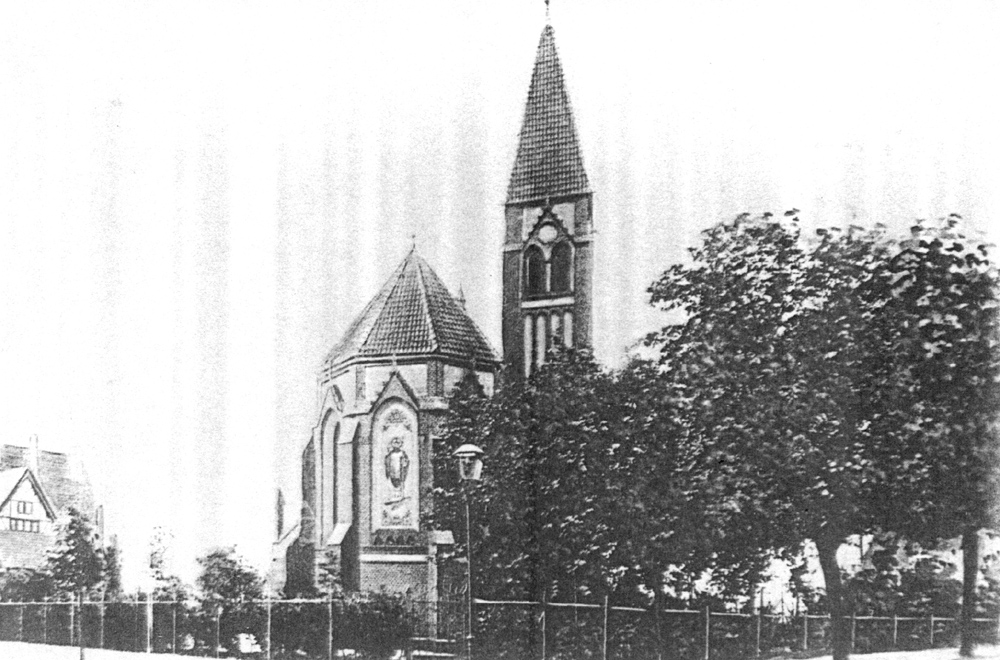
Chapel in 1904

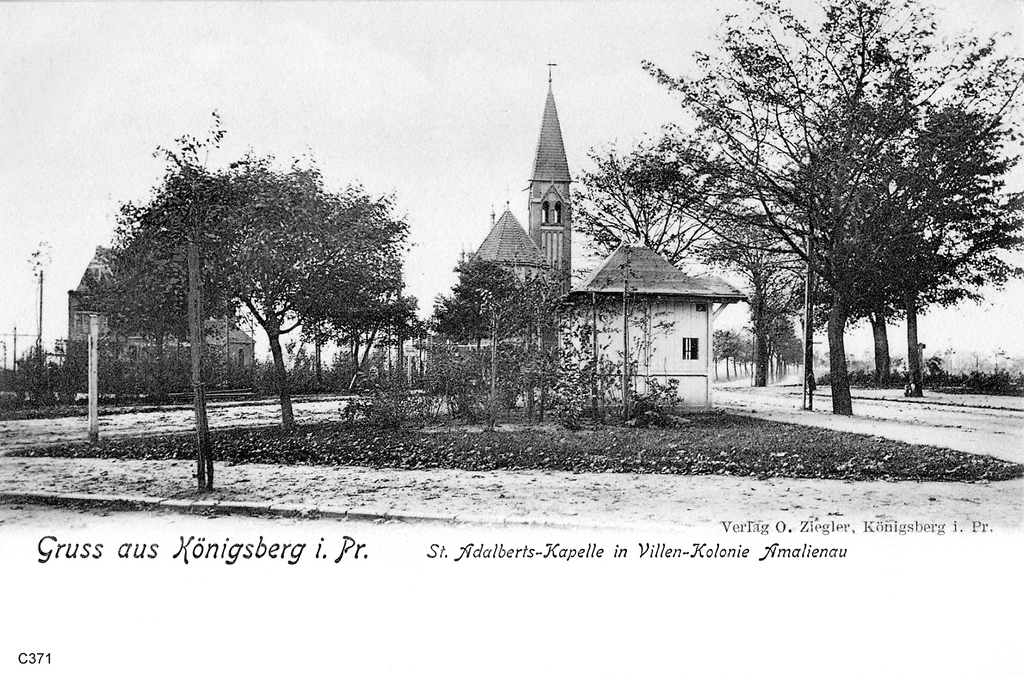
Chapel ca. 1908

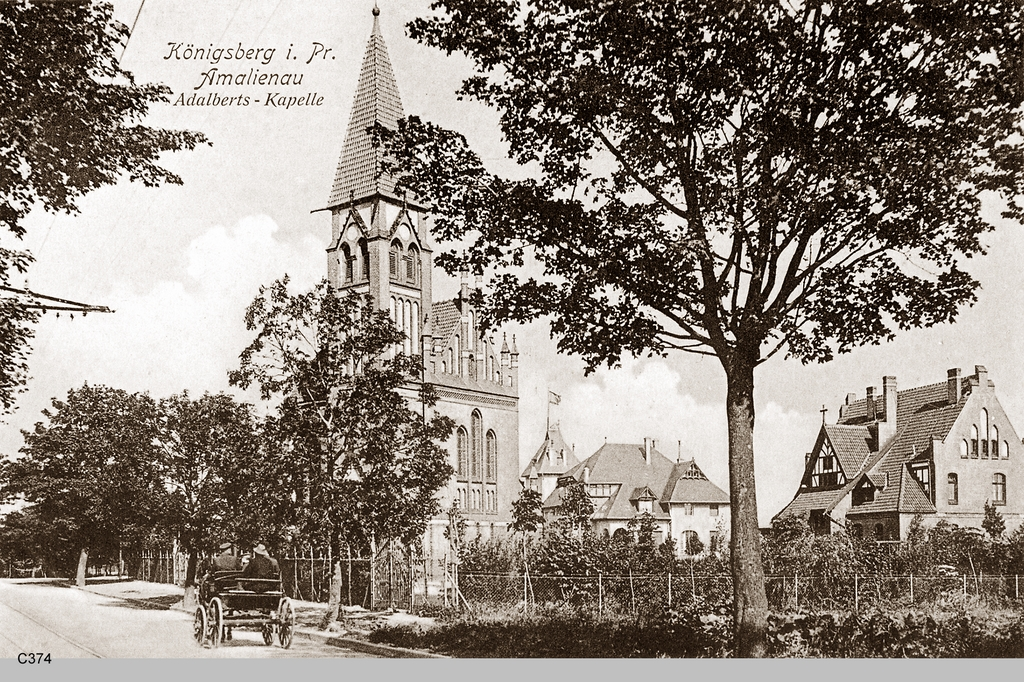
Chapel ca. 1908

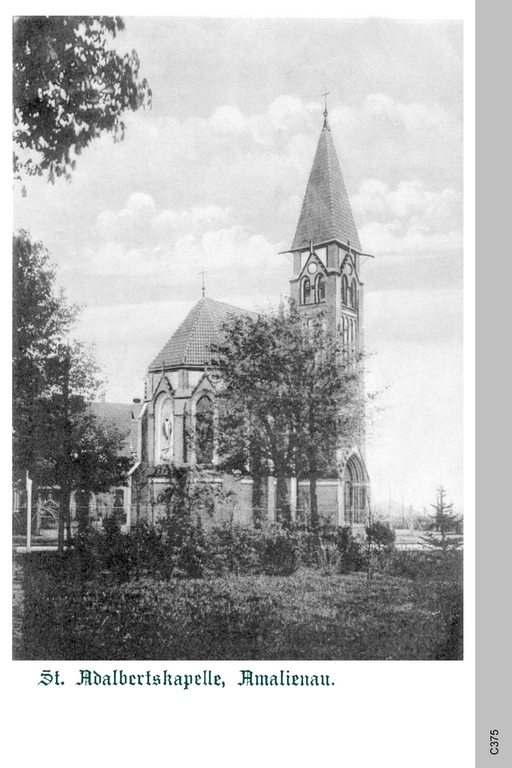
Chapel ca. 1908

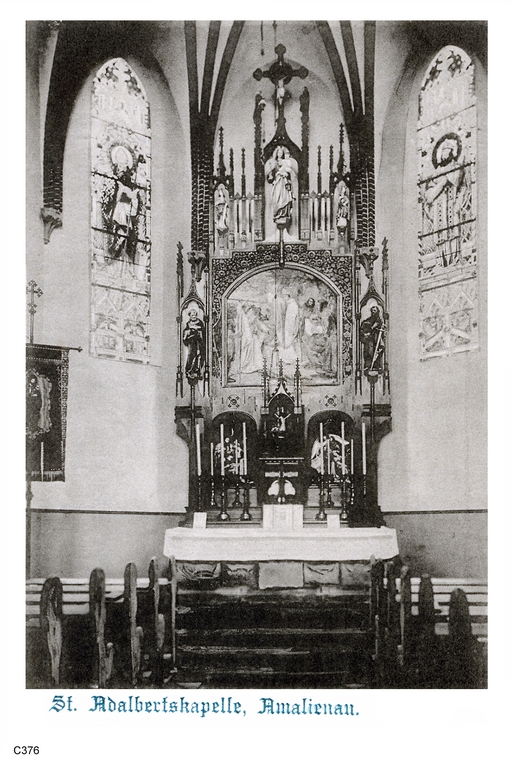
Interior of the chapel ca. 1908

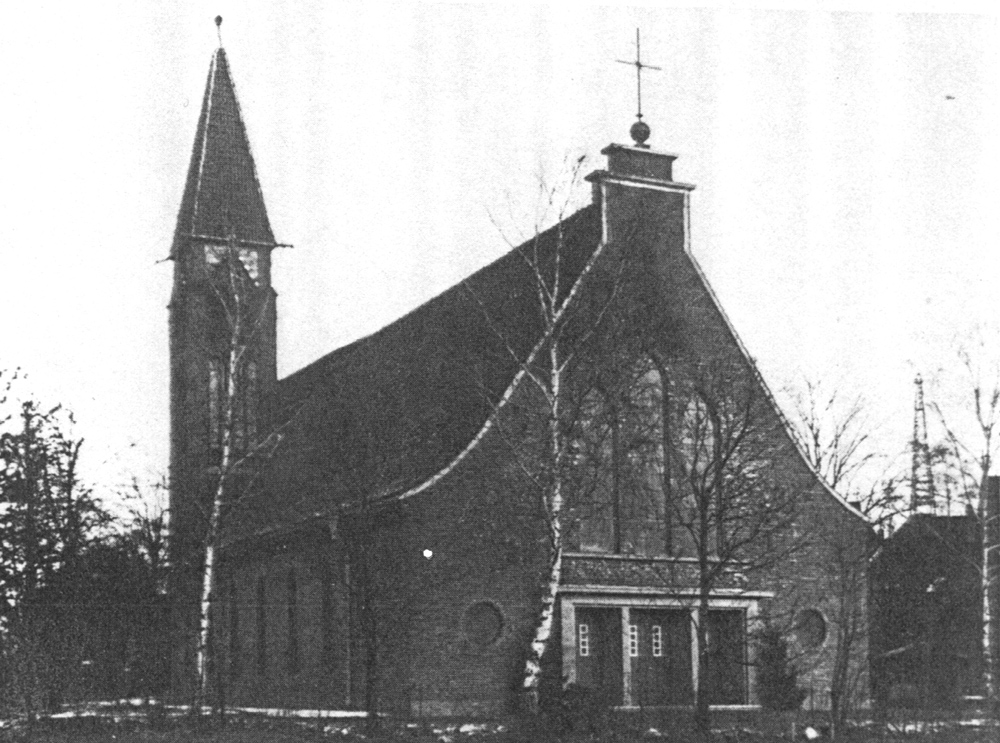
St. Adalbert's Church in 1932

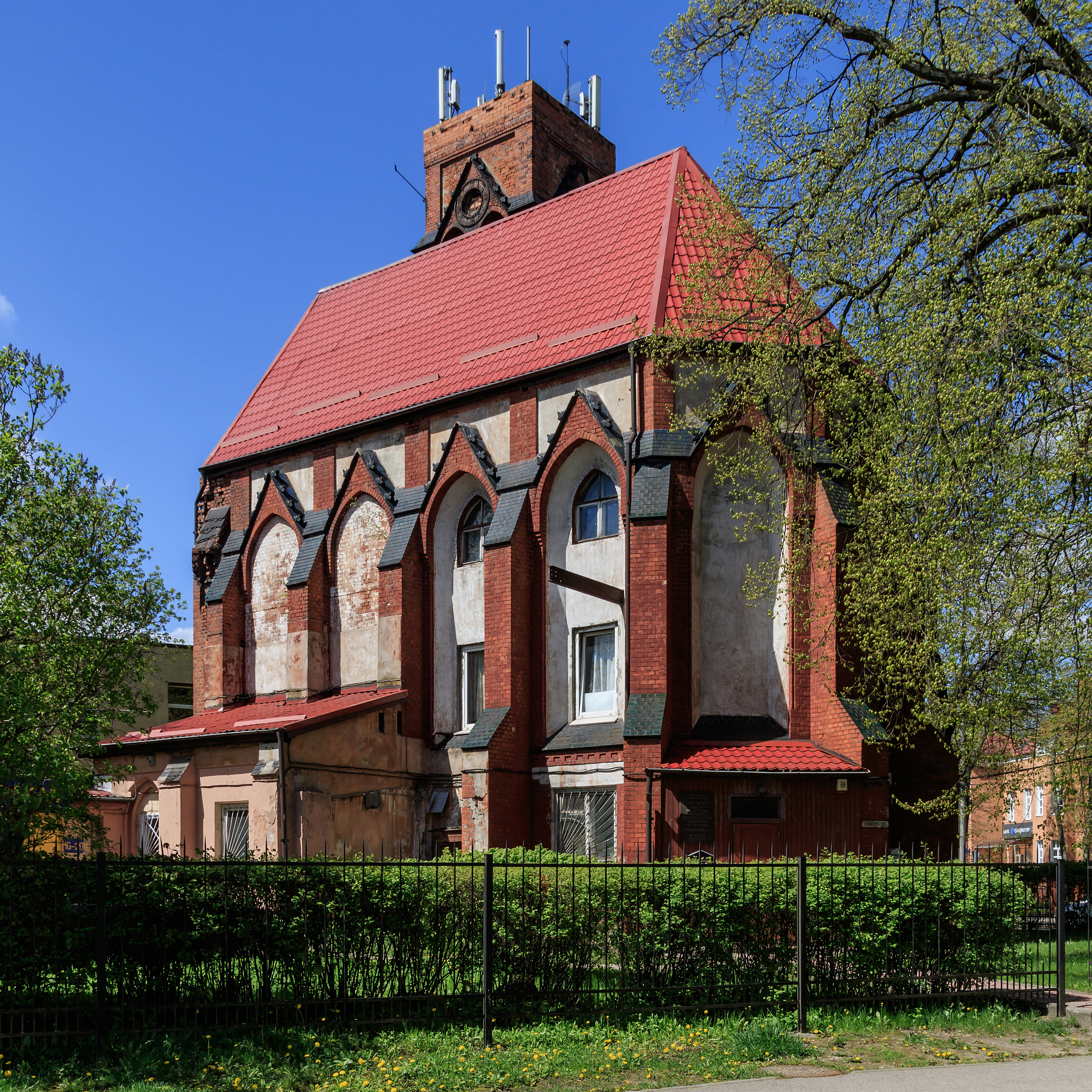
The church before its restoration, 2017.
