= Karl Faber =

German historian and archivist (1773–1853)

Karl Peter Andreas Faber (12 August 1773 – 19 January 1853) was a Prussian archivist and historian.

A native of Königsberg, East Prussia, Faber became chief archivist of the Prussian State Archive in 1808 after attending the University of Königsberg. Faber and Ernst Hennig were the first of Königsberg's archivists to approach the subject in a scientific manner. Faber made public letters from Martin Luther to Albert, Duke of Prussia in 1811. Works by Faber include his Taschenbuch für Königsberg in 1829 and Die Haupt- und Residenzstadt Königsberg in 1841. He also briefly produced a newspaper, Königsberger Abendzeitung, in 1831 and received an honorary doctorate from the philosophy faculty in 1837. Faber died in his native city.
