= Oktyabrsky Administrative District, Kaliningrad =

Former municipal district in Kaliningrad Oblast, Russia

Oktyabrsky Administrative District (Russian: Октя́брьский район) was a district (raion) of the city of Kaliningrad, Kaliningrad Oblast, Russia.

The Oktyabrsky Administrative District was formed on 25 July 1947. In accordance with the decision of the District Council of Deputies of the city of Kaliningrad dated 29 June 2009 No. 140, a reorganization was carried out: the Oktyabrsky Administrative District were merged into the Tsentralny Administrative District.
