= Georg Gelbke =

German painter

- Born: 12 September 1882; Rochlitz, Germany
- Died: 17 March 1947 (aged 64); Dresden, Germany
- Occupation: Painter

Georg Gelbke (12 September 1882 – 17 March 1947) was a German painter. His work was part of the art competitions at the 1928 Summer Olympics and the 1932 Summer Olympics.
