= Tsentralny Administrative District, Kaliningrad =

Tsentralny Administrative District Центральный район (Russian)
- District
- Coat of arms
- Location of Tsentralny Administrative District on the map of Kaliningrad
- Coordinates: 54°43′30″N 20°28′15″E
- Country: Russia
- Federal subject: Kaliningrad Oblast
- Established: January 7, 1952
- Administrative center: Kaliningrad

Area
  - Total: 79.8 km^{2} (30.8 sq mi)

Central District or Tsentralny District (Russian: Центральный район) is a district (raion) of the city of Kaliningrad, Kaliningrad Oblast, Russia. Population: 119,966 (2010 Census); 80,039 (2002 Census); 84,892 (1989 Soviet census).. It is the largest district of Kaliningrad and third largest by the population.

Located north-west from the city's historical center, nowadays it includes the former districts of Amalienau, Ratshof and Hufen, which became part of Konigsberg in early 20th century and was a part of former Oktyabrsky District until it was merged with Tsentralny.

== History ==
Tsentralny District was established on January 7, 1952, as former part of Stalingradsky District of Kaliningrad. Being seated on the north-west part of the city, the District inherited its name from a mid 20th century project of a city's new administrative center, which was planned to be established on a Komsomolskaya and Karl Marx streets intersection in former Hufen as a result of the destruction of Königsberg Castle, which was former seat of city's government.

== Sightseeing ==
Tsentralny District is the least damaged part of former Konigsberg, caused by Allied and Soviet bombardment during WW2. The most notable places of interest in this district are:

- Kaliningrad Zoo
- Drama Theatre, former Luisentheater
- Buildings of Baltic Federal University, located on Chernyshevskogo, 56A and intersection of Sovietsky ave. and Mira ave.
- Mira avenue and Pobedy avenue, located mostly in Amalienau and Hufen districts.
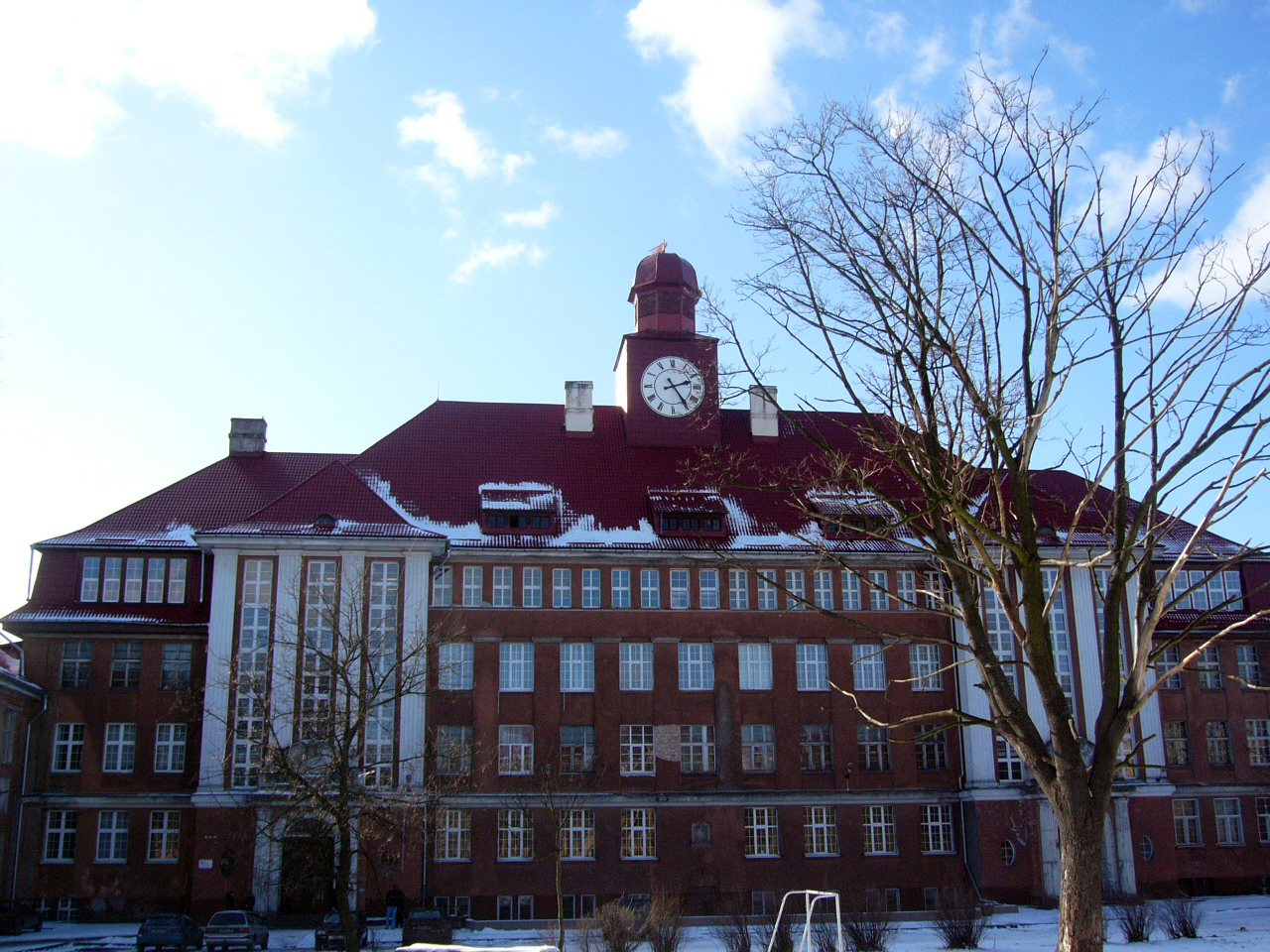
Building of Baltic Federal University on Chernyshevskogo, 56A

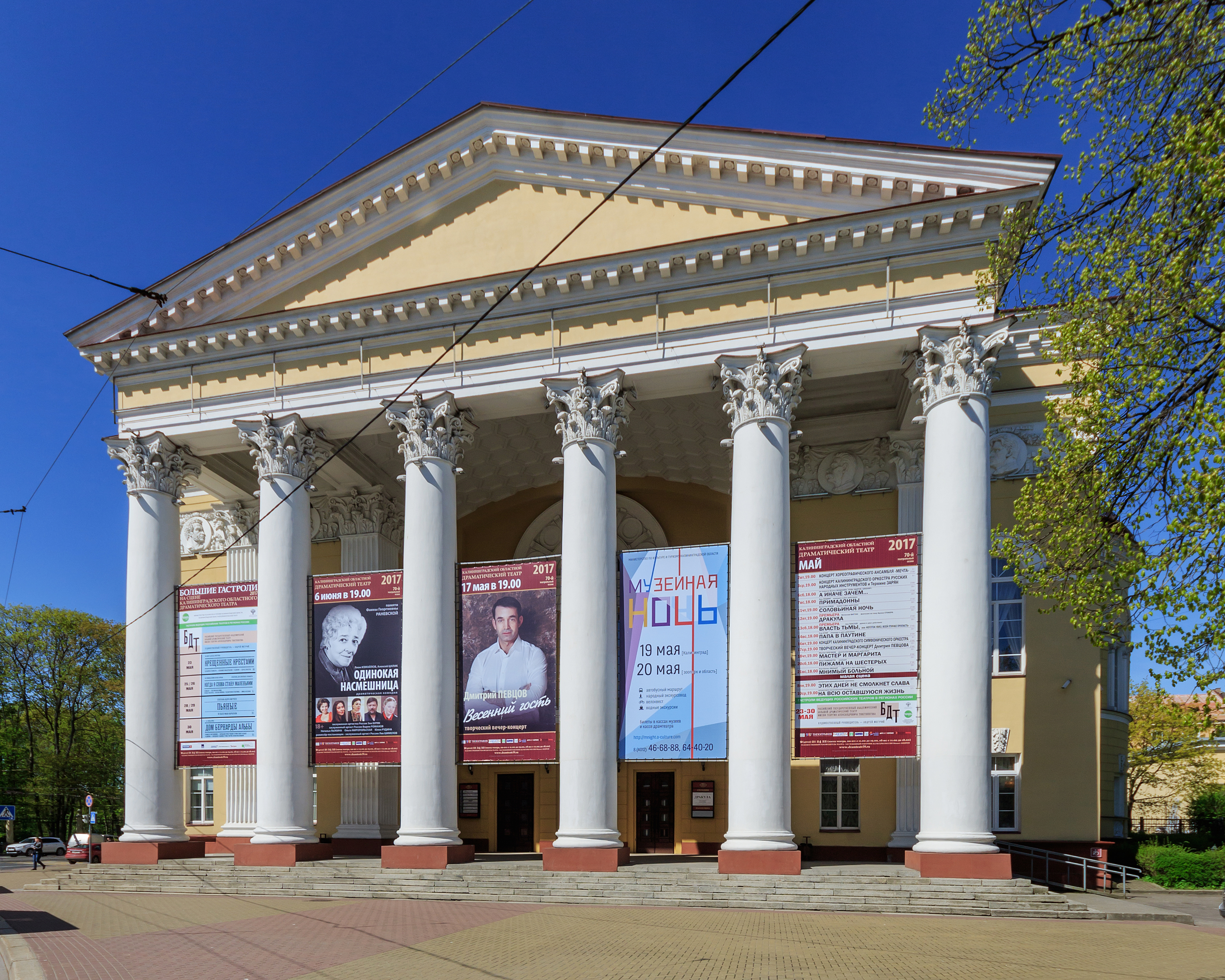
Drama theatre
