= Amalienau =

Coordinates: 54°43′05″N 20°27′54″E

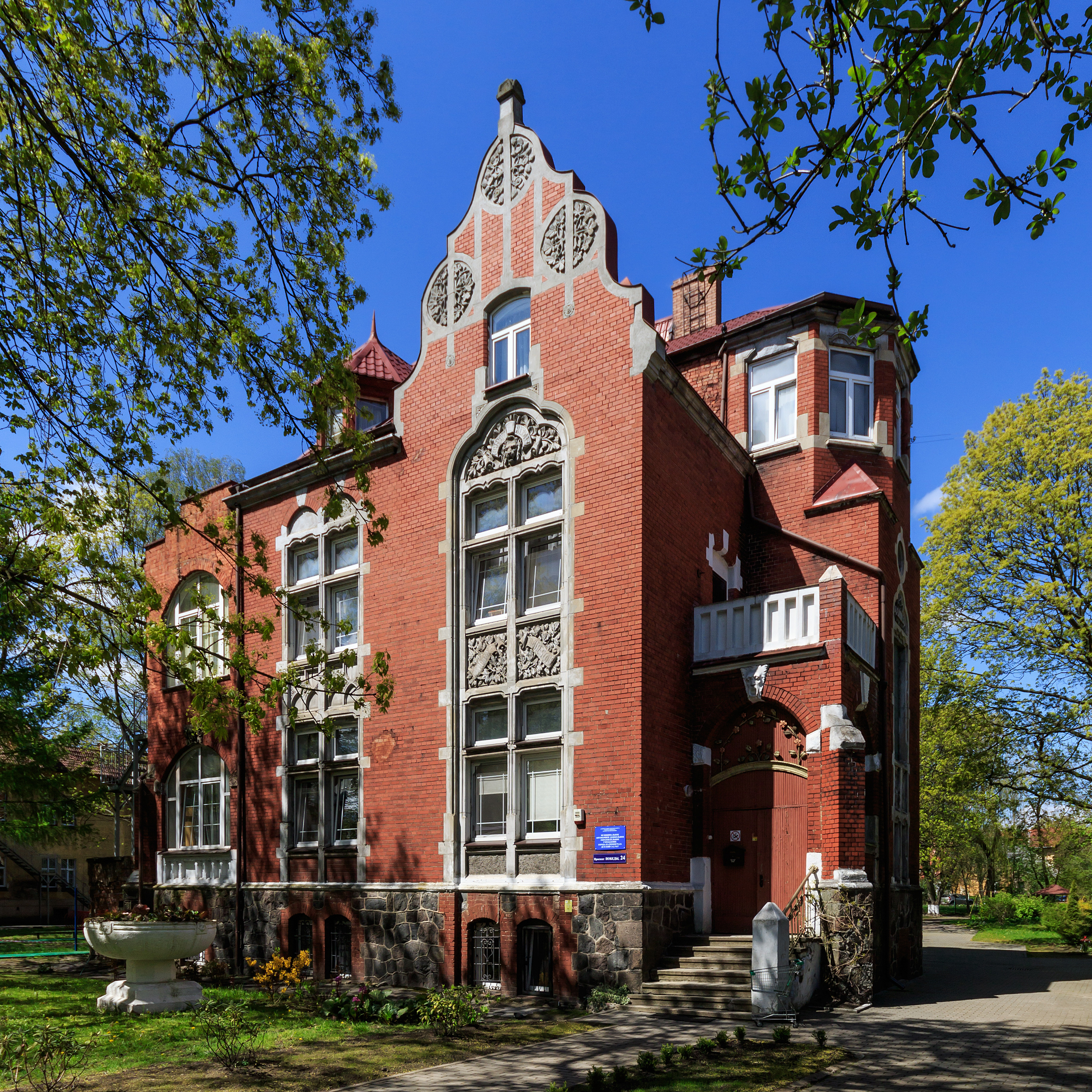
The Villa Schmidt, built in 1903, has been maintained in Kaliningrad

Amalienau was a suburban quarter of western Königsberg, Germany. Its territory is now part of the Tsentralny District of Kaliningrad, Russia.

== History ==
Amalienau originally contained the village Hinterhufen (further Hufen) in the western part of the Hufen region northwest of medieval Königsberg. By the middle of the 16th century, it was largely deforested. As a result of the Prussian administrative reorganization following the Napoleonic Wars, the region was included within the rural district of Königsberg (Landkreis Königsberg i. Pr.), part of Regierungsbezirk Königsberg in East Prussia, on 1 February 1818.

From 1810-20 the Königsberg commerce councilor Gustav Schnell purchased the various estates around Hinterhufen and united them into a single estate named after his wife, Amalie Schnell (née Gramatzki). In 1858 Amalienau was raised to the status of an estate district (Gutsbezirk) by its owner, Anton Douglas (1817-83). Douglas was married to Charlotte Warschauer and was a brother-in-law of Eduard Simson.

On 3 June 1898 parts of Amalienau were transferred from the rural district of Königsberg (Landkreis Königsberg i. Pr.) into the urban district of Königsberg (Stadtkreis Königsberg i. Pr). The remainder of Amalienau was finally incorporated into the city of Königsberg on 1 April 1905. Neighboring quarters were Ratshof to the west and Mittelhufen to the north and east.

In 1898 Friedrich Heitmann and Joseph Kretschmann, architects and construction officials, founded the Königsberger Immobilien- und Baugesellschaft (Königsberg Real Estate and Building Company). In 1901 they began to develop Amalienau into a villa suburb (Villenvorort or Villenkolonie) for the upper class. North of Amalienau was the estate of Klein Amalienau.

Public squares in Amalienau and along the border with Mittelhufen included Skagerrakplatz, Friedrich-Wilhelm-Platz, Luisenplatz, and Ziethenplatz. Churches in the quarter included the Protestant Königin-Luise-Gedächtniskirche (1899) and the Roman Catholic St. Adalbert's (1902).

The Zwillingsteich, consisting of two linked ponds, was created in 1909. An airship hangar was constructed in Amalienau in 1913. An old hammer forge was converted into a cafe and Gasthaus. The football club SV Prussia-Samland Königsberg played at Sportplatz Prussia-Samland on Steffeckstraße on the western outskirts of the quarter.

While most of Königsberg was heavily damaged by the 1944 Bombing of Königsberg and the 1945 Battle of Königsberg, Amalienau emerged relatively unscathed from World War II, except for some damage to the two churches. Soviet officials often used Amalienau's villas after the war, with many of the buildings maintained in modern Kaliningrad.

== Villas ==
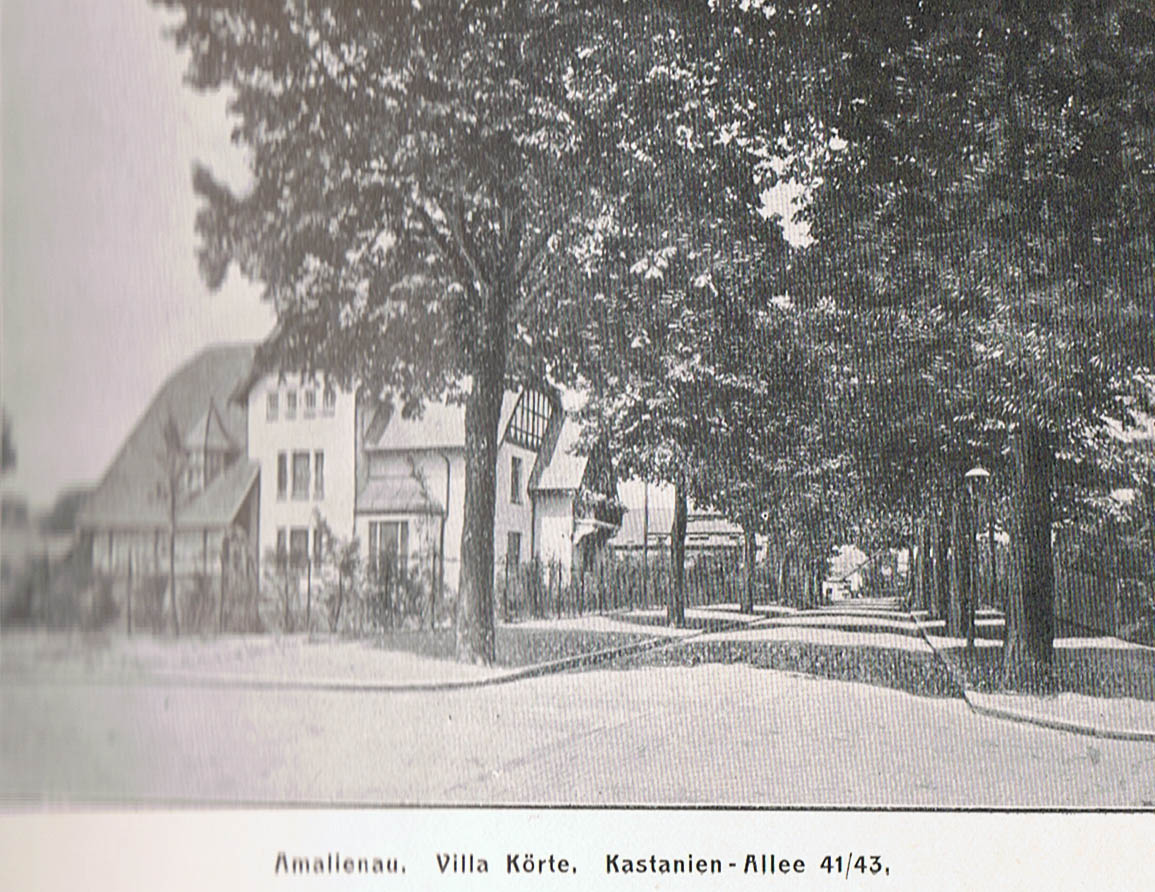
Villa Körte of the Lord Mayor of Königsberg, Siegfried Körte

Notable historical villas in Amalienau included:

- Villa Heitman of architect Friedrich Heitmann
- Villa Krohne of city councillor Theodor Krohne
- Villa Leo of Ludwig Leo, owner of the shipping company Marcus Cohn
- Villa Lewandowski used by the owners of the industrialists Albrecht & Lewandowski
- Villa Aron of the court jeweler D. Aron
- Villa Gelbke of painter Georg Hermann Gelbke
- Villa Barth of the miner director Barth
- Lithuanian General Consulate
- Villa Winter of Salomon Winter, owner of a pea husking mill
- Villa Krahmer
- Villa Mehl of architect Ernst Mehl
- Villa Körte of Lord Mayor Siegfried Körte
- Villa Schlegelberger of Rudolf Schlegelberger, cofounder of the Norddeutsche Creditanstalt
- Landhaus Frick of architect Paul Frick
- Doppelvilla Rosencrantz
- private preschool of the Rausch siblings
- Villa Perkuhn of the official Carl Ludwig Perkuhn
- Villa Kayma of Albert Kayma, directory of the Ostmark-Klinik
- Villa Neumann of Klaus Neumann
- workshop of Gertrud Windelband
