= Hufen =

Coordinates: 54.7176°N 20.4778°E

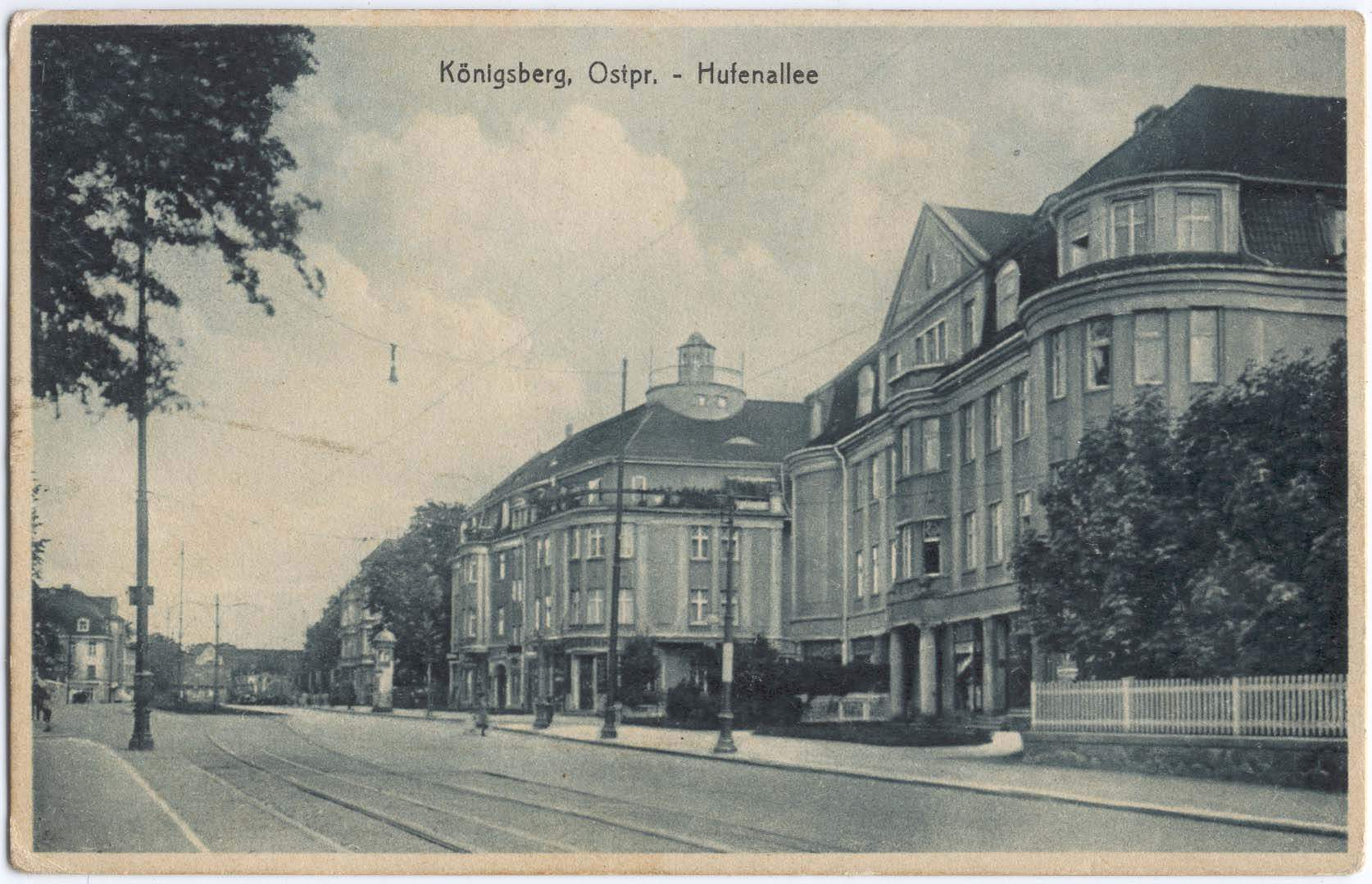
View of the main street of the Mittelhufen - Hufenallee, near the intersection with Luisenallee, 1920s-1930s

Hufen was a broad region along northwestern Königsberg, Germany, which developed into the quarters of Ratshof, Amalienau, Mittelhufen, and Vorderhufen. The territory is now part of the Tsentralny District of Kaliningrad, Russia.

== History ==
Hufen's name was derived from the system of measurement Hufe, approximately 30 morgen. Under the control of Altstadt by 1286, it was known as Huben by 1300. It originally extended north and west from Steindamm Gate. By 1710 Altstadt had foresters tending to the Kaporner Heath northwest of Königsberg, living along the Alte Pillauer Landstraße on the road to Pillau. Rich Königsbergers began to visit the countryside in summertime. By the end of the 18th century Hufen consisted of the estate Ratshof and the villages Vorderhufen ("near Hufen") in the north, Mittelhufen ("middle Hufen") in the northwest, and Hinterhufen ("further Hufen"), later known as Amalienau. Hardershof developed north of Mittelhufen in the early 19th century.

In 1786 Theodor Gottlieb von Hippel the Elder established the Bohlenweg, a road allowing easier access to the estate Pojenter Hof (later the Luisenwahl Park). The Bohlenweg-Verein was an association of villa owners founded at the beginning of the 19th century.

The theologian Ehregott Andreas Christoph Wasianski (July 3, 1755 - April 17, 1831), a friend and biographer of the great German philosopher Immanuel Kant, lived in what would become the Villa Hufenterrasse. In 1812 the Laufenhof manor was converted into the Villa Conradshof. Seven villas burned down in 1826.

Hufen was connected to Lawsken in 1829 by the construction of a chaussee. Hufen increasingly developed into residential suburbs for Königsberg's high society and financiers; notable buildings included Etablissement Conradshof, Park Villa Nova, Villa Hufenpark, Hufenterrasse, Villa Bella, the Konditorei Amende, Birkenhäuschen, Fortuna, Flora, Drachenfels, and Julchenthal.

Amalienau was incorporated into the city of Königsberg (Stadtkreis Königsberg i. Pr) piecemeal on 3 June 1898 and 1 April 1905. Vorderhufen and Mittelhufen were also merged into the city on the latter date. The main thoroughfare through Hufen was Hufen-Allee, which became Kniprodestraße in Steindamm and Neurossgarten at its eastern extremity and extended west to Königsberg's outer suburbs, such as Metgethen and Moditten. Hufen's streets were the first in Königsberg to be uniformly named, often honoring noted personalities from the city's history. The Zahnärztliches Institut, a dental institute, opened on Alte Pillauer Landstraße in 1921 under the direction of Paul Adloff.

While most of Königsberg was heavily damaged by the 1944 Bombing of Königsberg and the 1945 Battle of Königsberg, the quarters of Hufen were relatively unscathed by World War II and have been maintained in modern Kaliningrad.
