= Theodor Gottlieb von Hippel the Elder =

German humorous writer (1741–1796)

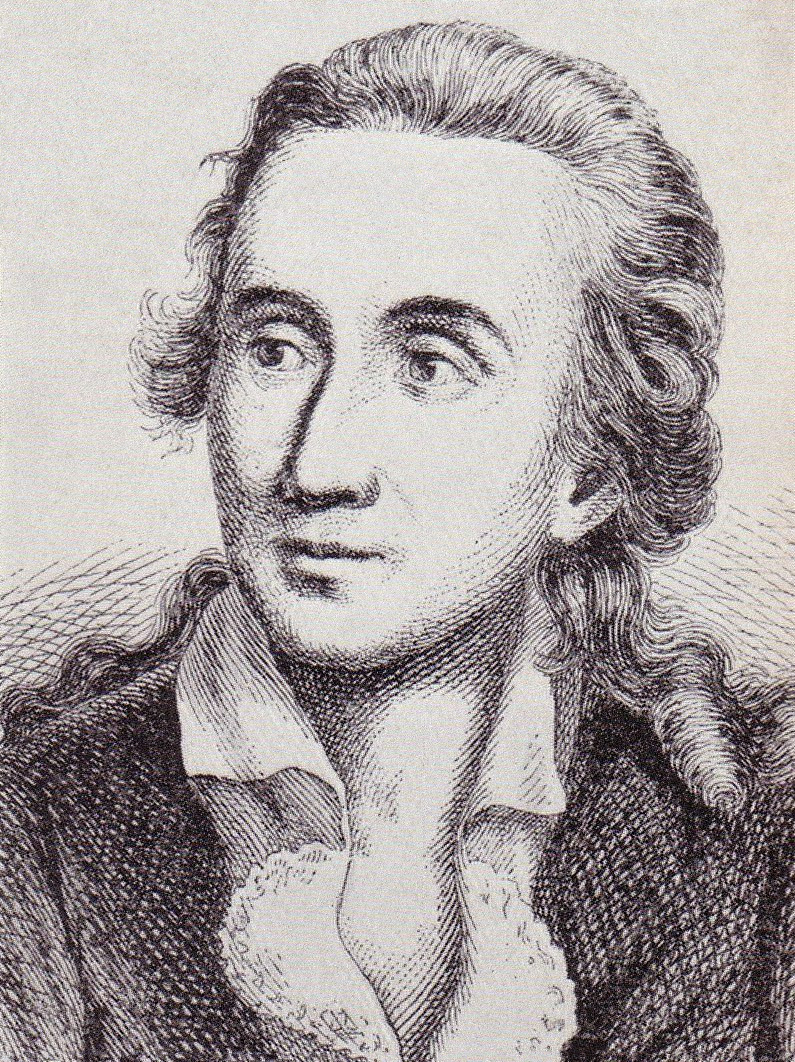
Theodor Gottlieb von Hippel

Theodor Gottlieb Hippel (von Hippel after 1790; 31 January 1741 – 23 April 1796) was a German satirical and humorous writer.

== Life ==
Hippel was born at Gerdauen in the Kingdom of Prussia, where his father was rector of a school. He enjoyed an excellent education at home, and in his sixteenth year he entered the University of Königsberg as a student of theology. Among his instructors was the philosopher Immanuel Kant, and the two became close friends.

Interrupting his studies, he went, on the invitation of a friend, to St Petersburg, where he was introduced at the court of the empress Catherine II. Returning to Königsberg he became a tutor in a private family; but, falling in love with a young lady of high position, his ambition was aroused, and giving up his tutorship he devoted himself with enthusiasm to legal studies. He was successful in his profession, and in 1780 was appointed chief burgomaster in Königsberg, and in 1786 privy councillor of war and president of the town. As he rose in the world, however, his inclination for matrimony vanished, and the lady who had stimulated his ambition was forgotten. He died at Königsberg on 23 April 1796, leaving a considerable fortune.

Hippel had extraordinary talents, rich in wit and fancy, but his was a character full of contrasts and contradictions. Cautiousness and ardent passion, dry pedantry and piety, morality and sensuality; simplicity and ostentation composed his nature and, hence, his literary productions never attained artistic finish. In his Lebenslaufe nach aufsteigender Linie (1778–81) he intended to describe the lives of his father and grandfather, but he eventually confined himself to his own. It is an autobiography, in which persons well known to him are introduced, together with a mass of heterogeneous reflections on life and philosophy. Kreuz- and Querzüge des Ritters A bis Z (1793–94) is a satire levelled against the follies of the age: ancestral pride and the thirst for orders, decoration and the like.

Among others of his better known works were Über die Ehe (1774) and Über die bürgerliche Verbesserung der Weiber (1792). In the latter essay, Hippel argued that the natural traits of women make them superior for many tasks, especially education. According to Jane Kneller, Hippel's "central claim" in this essay is that "excluding women from the public square is a travesty of justice that prevents the advancement of humanity toward genuine civilization." Timothy F. Sellner has produced an English translation of this work under the title On Improving the Status of Women. Hippel was once called the forerunner of Jean Paul, and had some resemblance to this author, in his constant digressions and in the interweaving of scientific matter in his narrative. Like Richter he was strongly influenced by Laurence Sterne. He never married.

In 1827–38 a collected edition of Hippel's works in 14 volumes was issued at Berlin. Über die Ehe was edited by Emil Brenning (Leipzig, 1872) and Gustav Moldenhauer (Leipzig, n.d. [c. 1905]), and the Lebenslaufe nach aufsteigender Linie, in a modernized edition by Alexander von Oettingen (1878), went through several editions. See J Czerny, Sterne, Hippel and Jean Paul (Berlin, 1904).
