= Kaliningrad Zoo =

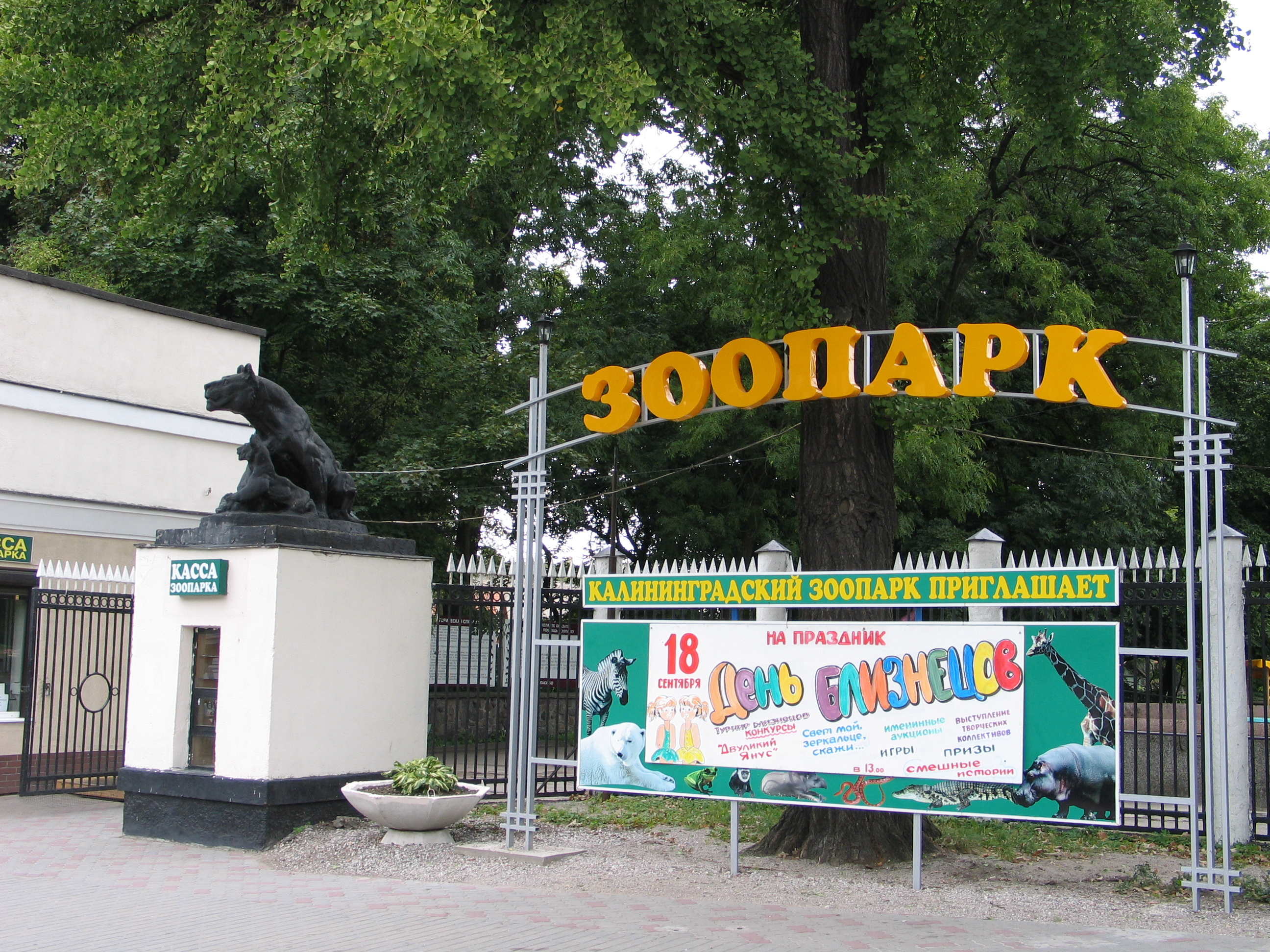
- Entrance to the Kaliningrad Zoo
- Interactive map of Kaliningrad Zoo
- 54°43′20″N 20°29′18″E
- Date opened: 1896
- Location: Kaliningrad, Russia
- Land area: 16.5 ha (40.8 acres)
- No. of animals: 2264 (2005)
- No. of species: 315
- Website: kldzoo.ru

The Kaliningrad Zoo (Russian: Калининградский зоопарк) was founded in 1896 as the Königsberger Tiergarten in the German town of Königsberg, which in 1945 became part of Russia and was renamed Kaliningrad. Thus, the zoo is one of the oldest zoological gardens in Russia, and one of the largest. Its collection, which extends over 16.5 ha, comprises 286 species with a total of 2130 individual animals (as of 31 December 2020).

== History ==
=== German period ===
The site of the modern zoo was home in 1895 to the Northeast German industrial and craft exhibition. Its supervisor Hermann Claaß proposed keeping the wooden pavilions to make a zoological garden. On 22 August 1895 the "Tiergarten Society" was created to realize the plan.

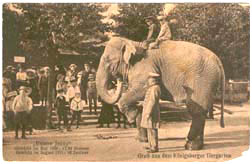
The elephant Jenny giving a ride to children in the Königsberg zoo (1911).

The zoo's opening took place on 21 May 1896. At that time, the collection had 893 specimens representing 262 species. In 1912 an ethnographic museum was established in the grounds of the zoo. In the 1930s this was moved to Mt. Hexenberg north of Hohenstein (now Olsztynek, Poland).

The zoo lost its prosperity when the First World War began and was closed on 17 August 1914. All available buildings were used by the military as warehouses for uniforms. The zoo opened again in 1918, but was unable, in the post-war decline, to regain its former glory. The collection diminished severely and consisted in 1921 only of 565 animals.

In 1938 the zoo became the property of the city of Königsberg, and the Tiergarten society was dissolved.

=== After the Second World War ===
Only four of the zoo's animals survived the Second World War: a deer, a donkey, a badger and a hippopotamus. The hippopotamus was injured in the fighting, but recovered later. In 1973 a patronage program was started in which Kaliningrad businesses would sponsor installations or animals in the zoo.

=== Statue ===
The first zoo director, Hermann Claaß, retired on 31 May 1913. Walter Rosenberg built a statue in his honor, which was erected on the main avenue of the park on 13 June. After the war the sculpture disappeared and was rediscovered only much later, in a private residence on Vatunin street occupied by the Gosstrakh. The pedestal of the statue was discovered in a playground on the intersection of Ogaryov and Kutuzov streets. In 1990 the monument was reassembled and re-erected in the zoo on its former spot.

=== Talking raven ===
A "talking raven" lived in the zoo.

=== Financial difficulties ===
In 2003, the zoo suffered from a lack of funding, sometimes even to the extent there is not enough food for the animals. Many of the animals survived by scrounging food from visitors.

== Collection ==
At the present, the Kaliningrad Zoo contains 2264 animals representing 315 different species.

- Mammals: 59 species, 292 specimens.
- Birds: 84 species, 572 specimens.
- Reptiles: 42 species, 97 specimens.
- Amphibians: 17 species, 59 specimens.
- Fish: 105 species, 1195 specimens.
- Invertebrates: 8 species, 49 specimens.

== Photographs ==
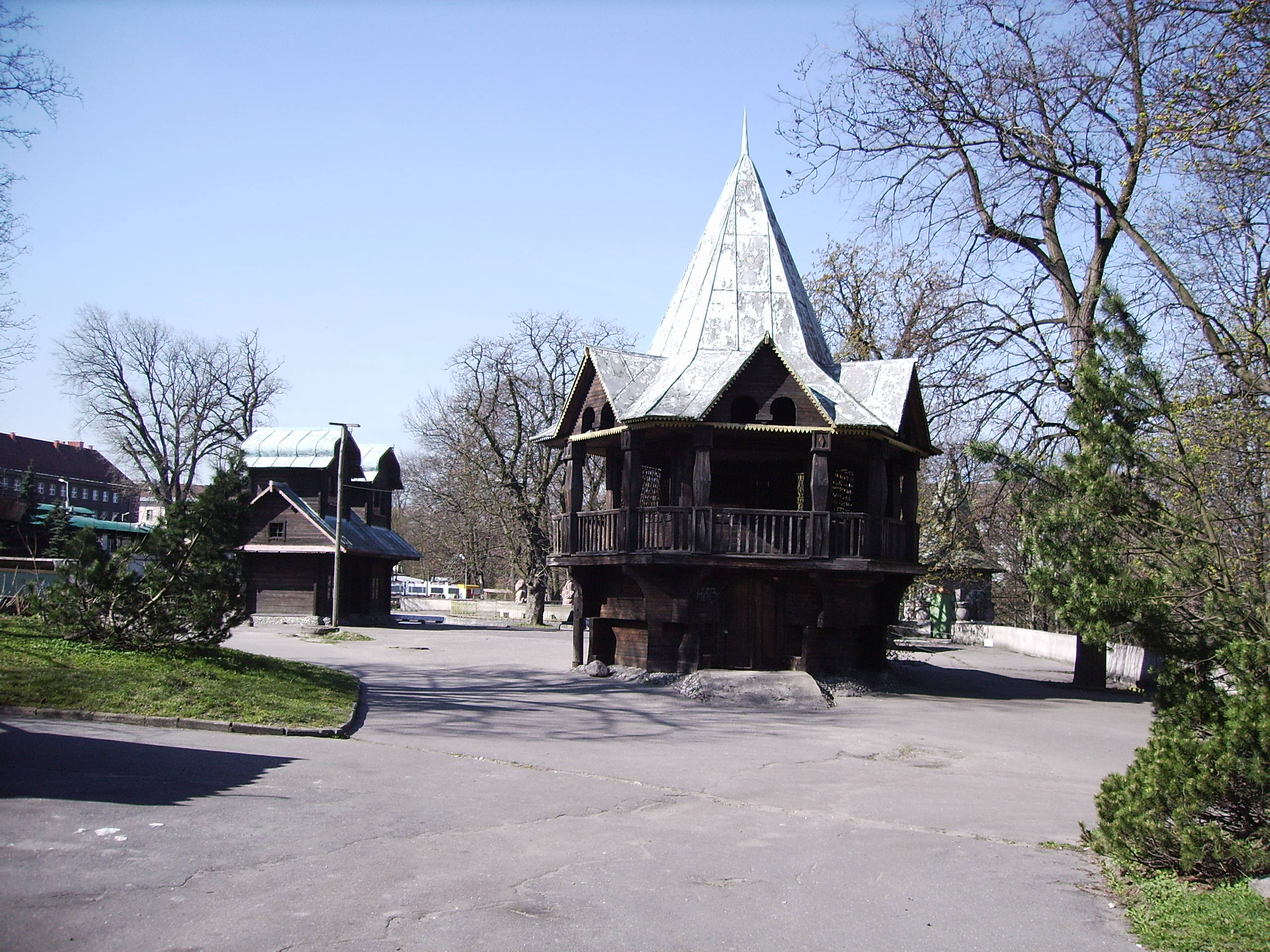
The remains of the "Fairy-Tale Town"

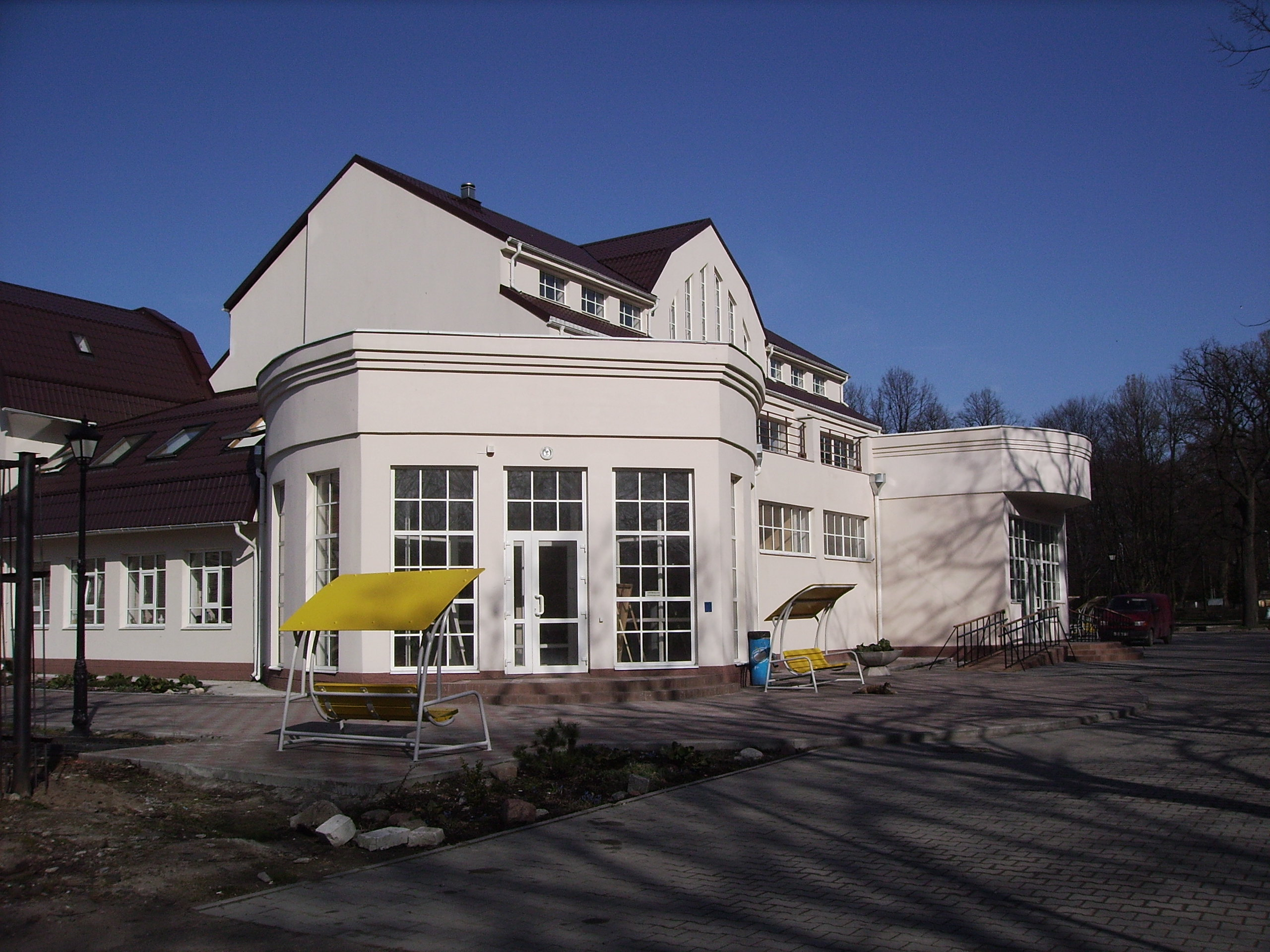
This building in the zoo was built as a restaurant in 1911. After the war, it was rebuilt as the elephant house. It was recently restored and now houses the zoo's administration. The building is protected as a historical monument.
