= Leningradsky Administrative District, Kaliningrad =

Leningradsky Administrative District Ленинградский район (Russian)
- District
- Location of Leningradsky Administrative District on the map of Kaliningrad
- Coordinates: 54°43′50″N 20°31′30″E
- Country: Russia
- Federal subject: Kaliningrad Oblast
- Established: 25 July 1947
- Administrative center: Kaliningrad

Area
  - Total: 53.7 km^{2} (20.7 sq mi)

Leningradsky Administrative District (Russian: Ленинградский район) is a district (raion) of the city of Kaliningrad, Kaliningrad Oblast, Russia. Population: 159,771 (2010 Census); 152,541 (2002 Census); 140,165 (1989 Soviet census).
