= Königsberg fortifications =

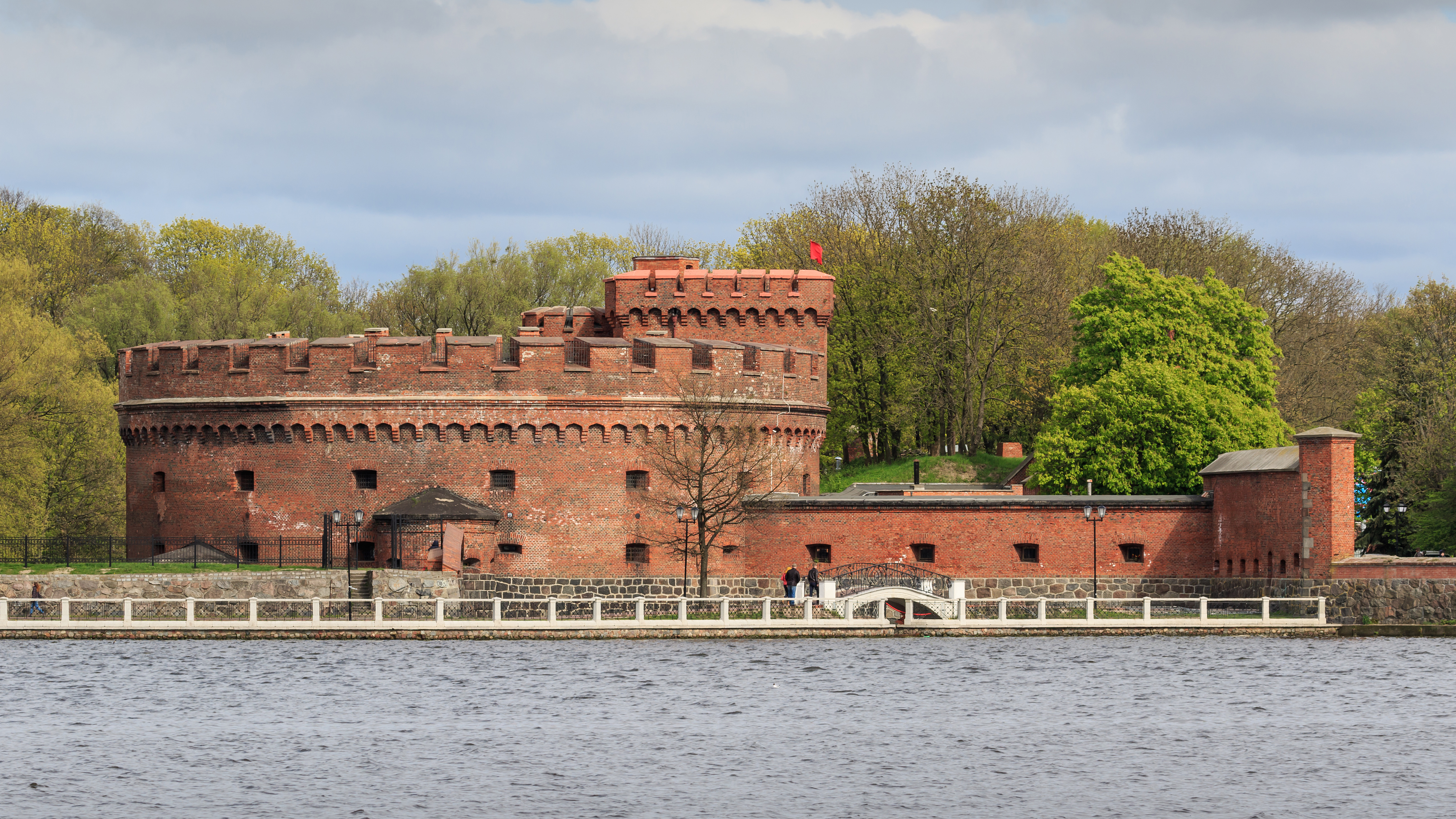
Dohna Tower, the last to surrender after the Soviet storming of Königsberg in 1945.

The fortifications of the former East Prussian capital Königsberg (now Kaliningrad) consist of numerous defensive walls, forts, bastions and other structures. They make up the First and the Second Defensive Belt, built in 1626—1634 and 1843—1859, respectively. The 15 metre-thick First Belt was erected due to Königsberg's vulnerability during the Polish–Swedish wars. The Second Belt was largely constructed on the place of the first one, which was in a bad condition. The new belt included twelve bastions, three ravelins, seven spoil banks and two fortresses, surrounded by a water moat. Ten brick gates served as entrances and passages through defensive lines and were equipped with moveable bridges.

The Königsberg fortifications became largely obsolete even before the completion of construction due to the rapid development of artillery. Following the military setbacks of Nazi Germany, however, they became strategically important again (particularly during the East Prussian offensive in 1945).

== Major fortifications ==
=== Astronomic Bastion ===
The Astronomic Bastion (German: Bastion Sternwarte) was erected in 1855-1860 and received its name from its proximity to the Königsberg Observatory. The bastion's wall was demolished in 1910. Subsequently the bastion was used to accommodate the Russian OMON for some time. Later the structure was bought by the Russian MP Asanbuba Niudyurbegov.

=== Bronsart Fort ===
The Bronsart Fort (German: Bronsart bei Mandein) was constructed in 1875-80 and is named after Prussian general Paul Bronsart von Schellendorff. It did not suffer much during military actions, remaining in quite good condition.

=== Dohna Tower ===
The Dohna Tower (German: Dohnaturm) was built in 1858 in Neo-Romanesque style and is named after Prussian politician Friedrich Ferdinand Alexander zu Dohna-Schlobitten. Following its restoration after World War II the tower started to accommodate the Amber Museum.

=== Friedrich Wilhelm I Fort ===
The King Friedrich Wilhelm I Fort, originally known as Quednau, is the largest fort of Königsberg.

=== Gneisenau Fort ===
The two-storeyed Gneisenau Fort was named after Prussian field marshal August von Gneisenau. It was heavily damaged by Soviet troops during World War II.

=== Grolman Bastion ===
The erection of Grolman Bastion, which was named after Prussian general Karl von Grolman, was finished in 1851. It is strengthened with casemates and caponiers inside its wall and consists of lesser Oberteich and Kupferteich Bastions.

=== Pillau Citadel ===
The construction of stone Pillau Citadel started in the beginning of the 17th century. The citadel gained its final appearance by the beginning of the 18th century.

=== Stein Fort ===
The large Stein Fort was named after Prussian statesman Baron vom Stein. It remained in better condition than some other fortifications because it lay a bit aside from the places of the main Soviet attacks during World War II.

== Minor structures ==
=== Barnekow Fort ===
The Barnekow Fort is one of the small forts, named after Prussian general Albert von Barnekow.

== See also ==
- Königsberg Castle
