= List of people from Königsberg =

The following is a list of people associated with the former city of Königsberg (Duchy of Prussia, Kingdom of Prussia, Germany) which was renamed to Kaliningrad, Soviet Union in 1946.

== Writing and public thinking ==
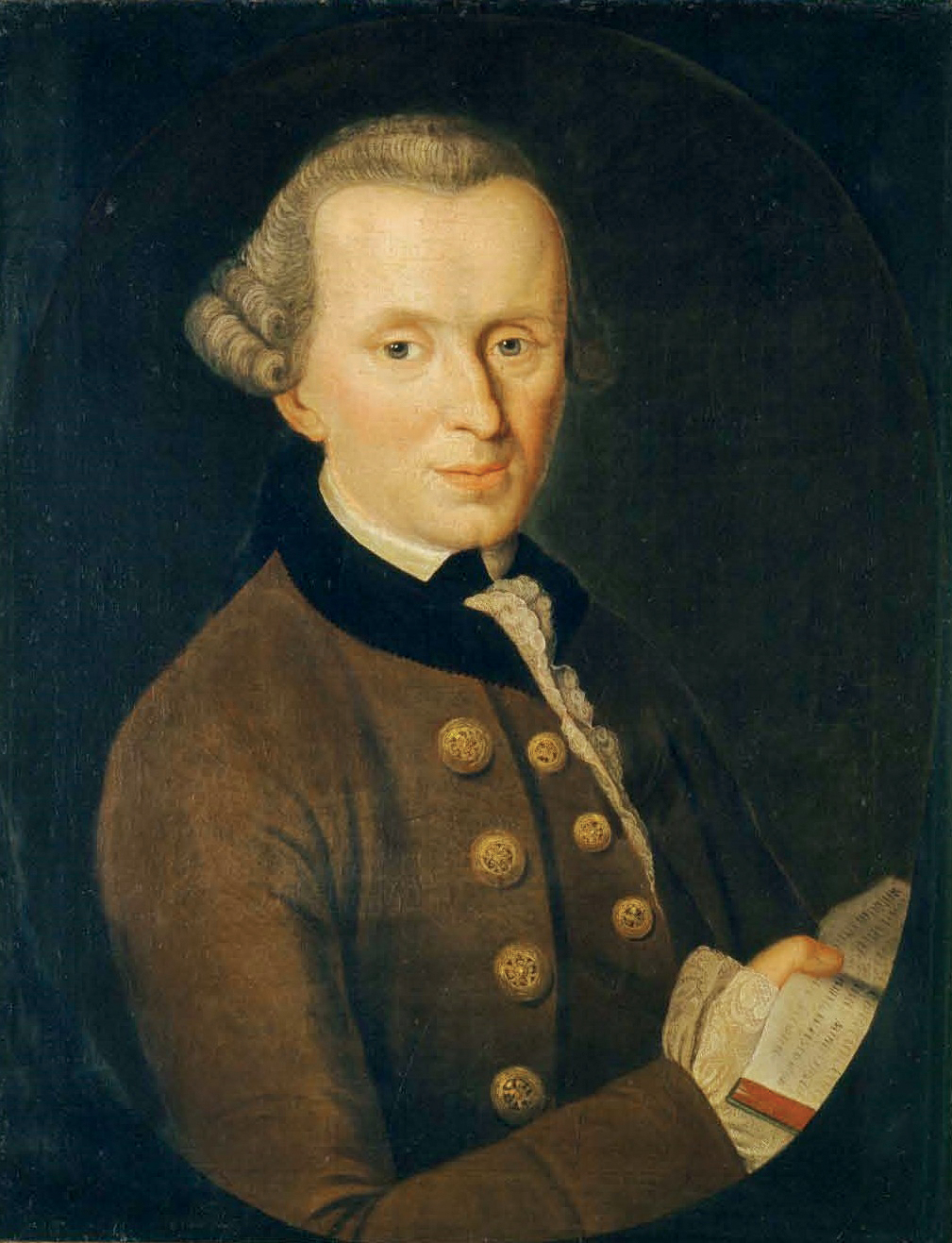
Immanuel Kant, 1763

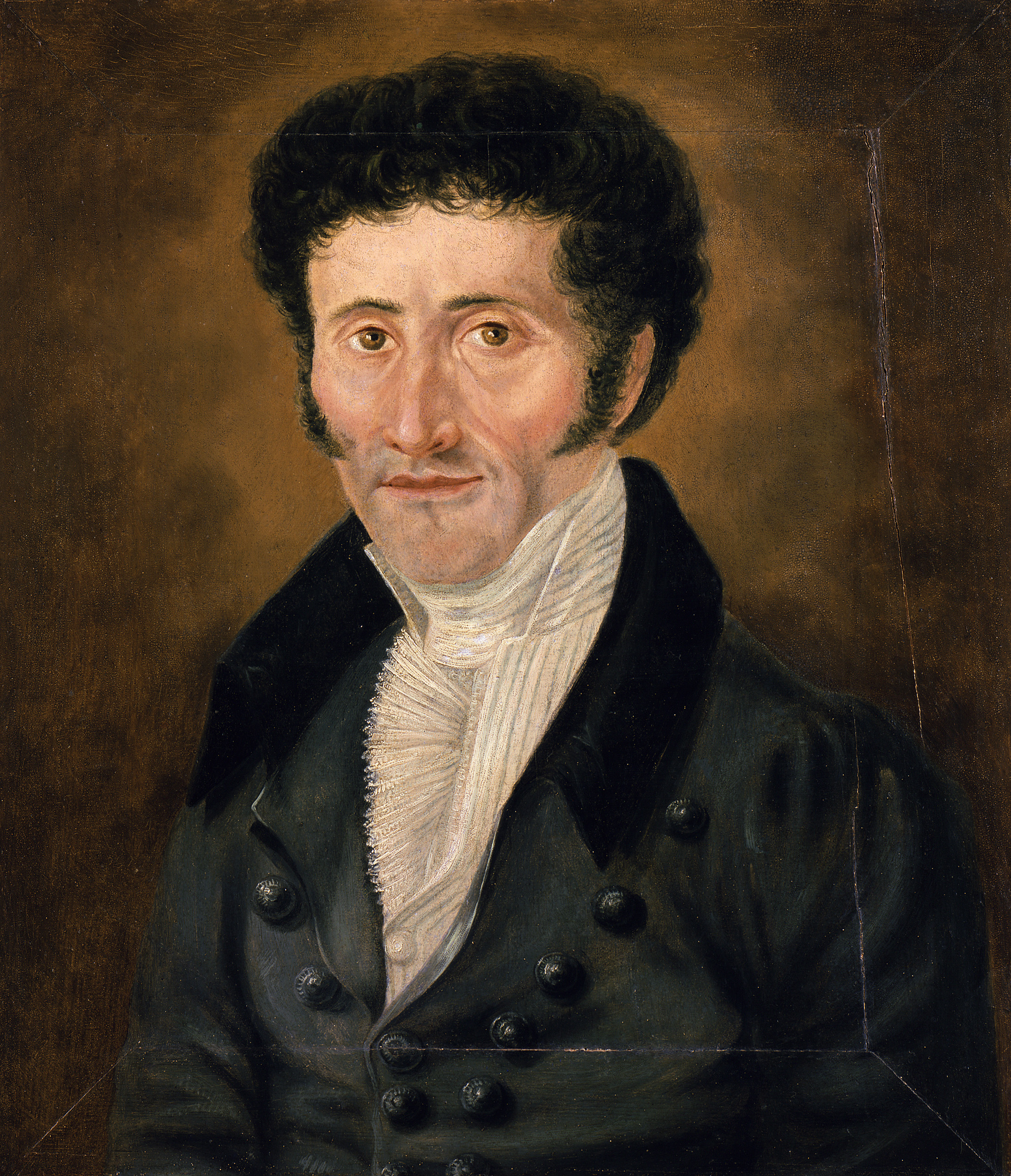
E. T. A. Hoffmann, pre-1822

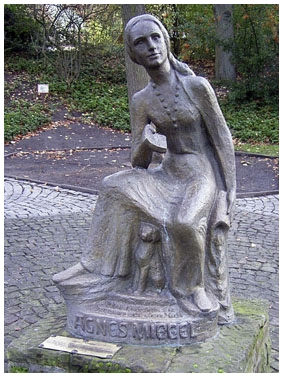
Agnes Miegel monument

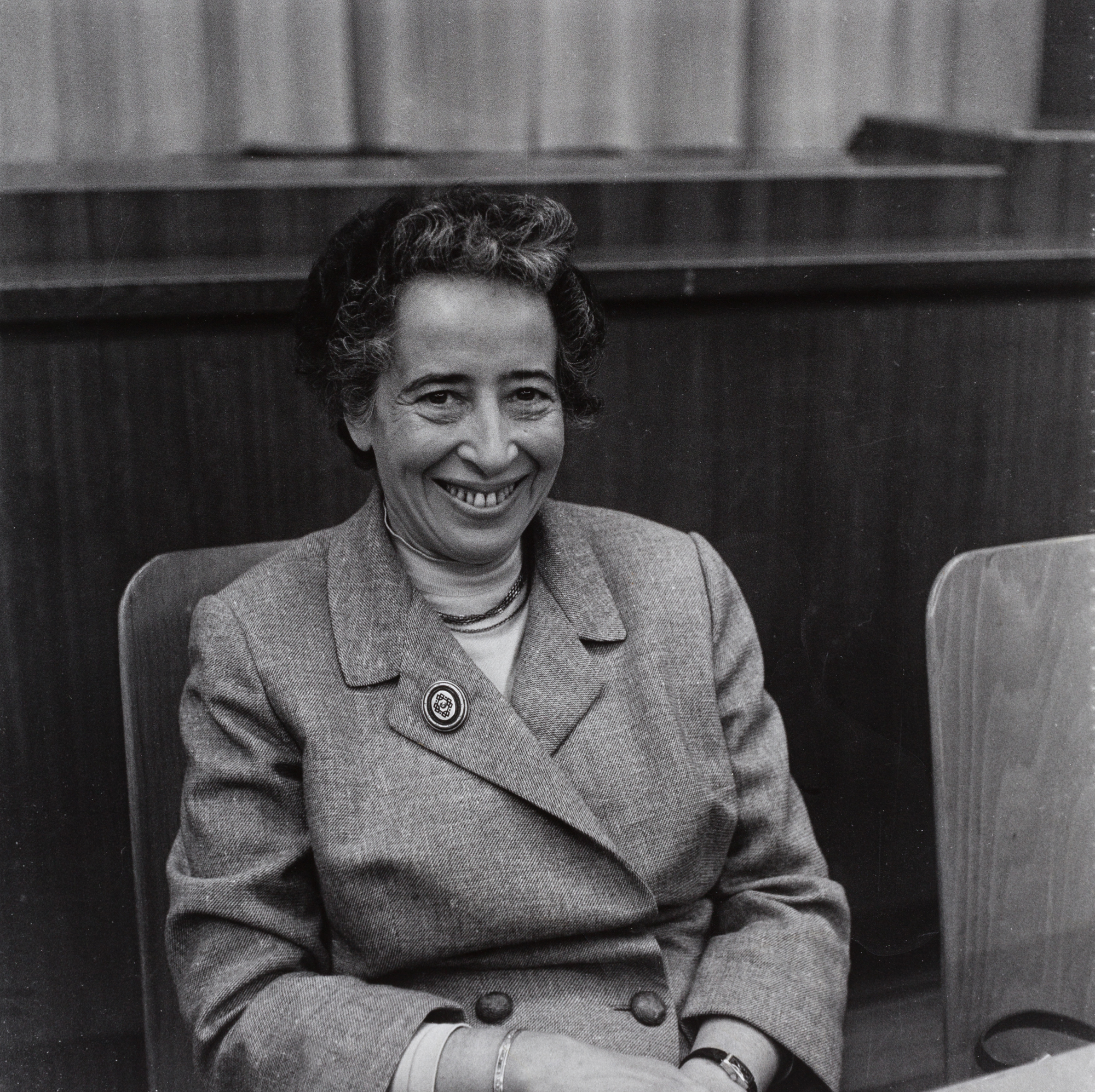
Hannah Arendt, 1958

- Stanislovas Rapalionis (1485–1545), at Königsberg Albertina University first translator of the Bible into Lithuanian
- Abraomas Kulvietis (1509–1545), religious reformer at Königsberg Albertina University
- Stanisław Murzynowski (c.1527–1553), Polish writer, translator and a Lutheran activist during the Protestant Reformation.
- Caspar Schütz (c.1540 Eisleben – 1594 Danzig), historian at Königsberg and Danzig, interest in the history of Prussia.
- Martynas Mažvydas (1510–1563), priest, writer and translator
- Jan Kochanowski (1530 in Sycyna – 1584) Polish poet, attended the University of Königsberg after 1547
- Simon Dach (1605 in Memel – 1659) a lyrical poet and hymnwriter
- Frederick I of Prussia (1657–1713), Elector of Brandenburg & Duke of Prussia
- John Ernest Grabe (1666–1711) an Anglican divine
- Johann Christoph Gottsched (1700–1766) philosopher, author and critic of the Age of Enlightenment
- Immanuel Kant (1724–1804), philosopher
- Johann Georg Hamann (1730–1788), philosopher
- Theodor Gottlieb von Hippel the Elder (1741–1796) a satirical and humorous writer
- Zacharias Werner (1768–1823) a poet, dramatist and preacher
- E. T. A. Hoffmann (1776–1822), author
- Karl Lehrs (1802–1878) a classical scholar
- Karl Rosenkranz (1805–1879) a philosopher and pedagogue
- Wincenty Pol (1807 in Lublin – 1872) Polish poet; was interned in Königsberg after the fall of the November Uprising in Russian partition of Poland.
- Abraham Mapu (1808–1867), Hebrew novelist
- Ferdinand Nesselmann (1811 Fürstenau – 1881 Königsberg), mathematician, historian, orientalist and philologist
- Fanny Lewald (1811–1889), feminist and author
- Theodor Goldstücker (1821–1872) a German Sanskrit scholar
- August Wilhelm Zumpt (1815–1877) a German classical scholar
- Bernhard Weiss (1827–1918) a Protestant New Testament scholar
- Emma Goldman (1869–1940), author and political theorist
- Friedrich Radszuweit (1876–1932), author and publisher
- Agnes Miegel (1879–1964), author
- Walter Liebenthal (1886–1982), sinologist and philosopher
- Hannah Arendt (1906–1975), political theorist and philosopher
- Leah Goldberg (1911–1970), Israeli poet
- Annemarie Bostroem (1922–2015), author
- Hans-Joachim Newiger, (1925–2011), philologist
- Leah Rabin (née Schloßberg) (1928–2000), author and wife of Yitzhak Rabin

== Scientists ==
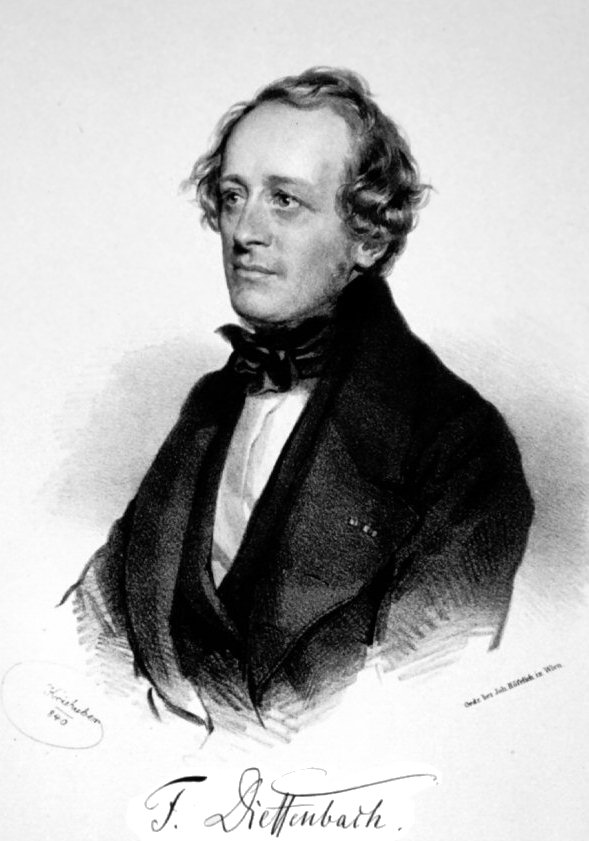
Johann Friedrich Dieffenbach, 1840

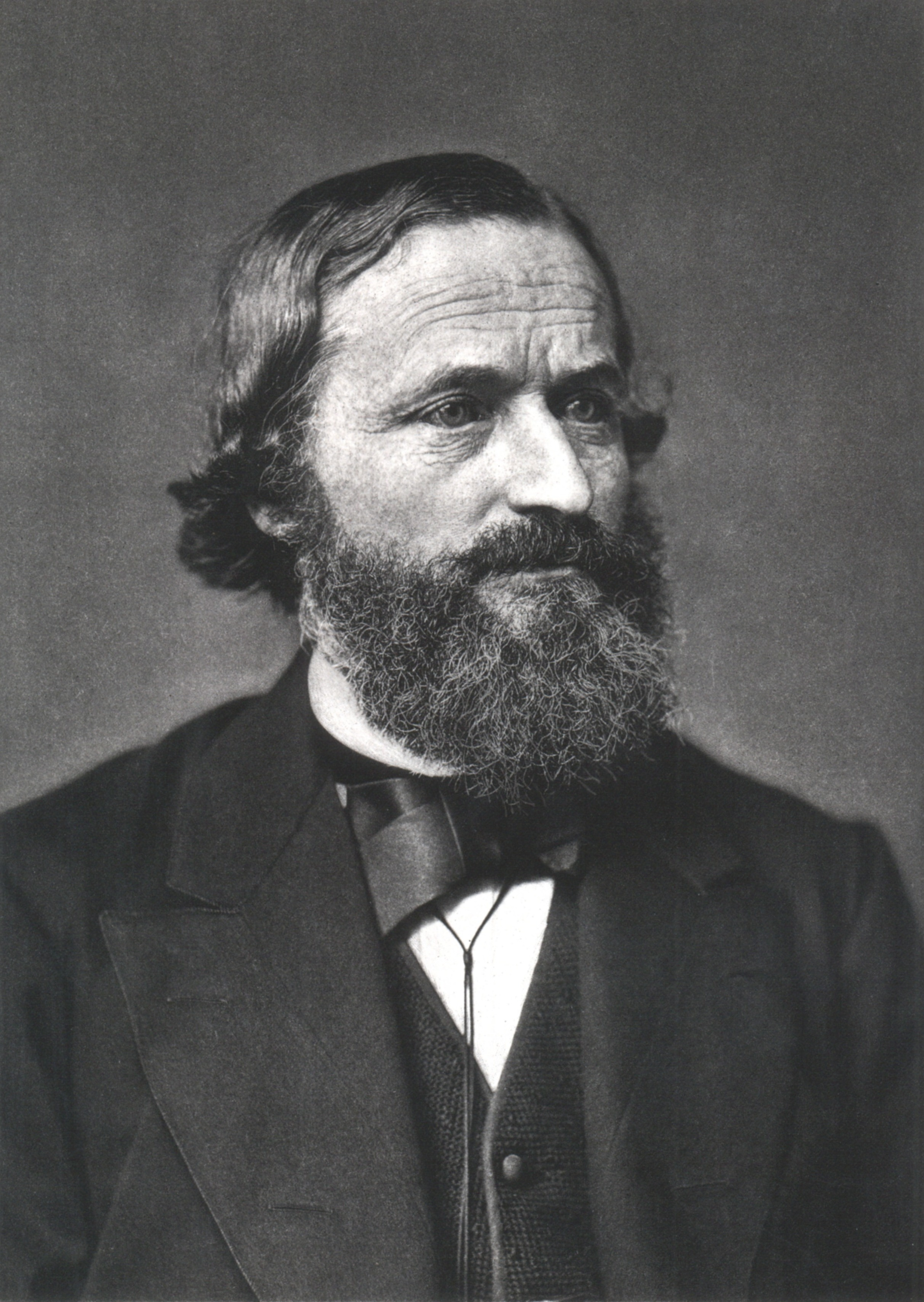
Gustav Robert Kirchhoff

- Johann Christoph Bohl (1703–1785), physician, professor, and sponsor of Kant
- Johann Bartsch (1709–1738), physician, botanist, and collaborator with Carl Linnaeus
- Karl Gottfried Hagen (1749–1829), chemist, opened first German chemistry lab at Königsberg's Albertina University
- Friedrich Bessel (1784–1846), astronomer, mathematician, physicist, and geodesist
- Johann Friedrich Dieffenbach (1792–1847), surgeon
- Gotthilf Hagen (1797–1884), physicist, contributed to fluid dynamics
- Philipp Johann Ferdinand Schur (1799–1878), German-Austrian pharmacist and botanist
- Adolph Eduard Grube (1812–1880), zoologist
- Hermann August Hagen (1817–1893) Cambridge, U.S., German entomologist
- Gustav Kirchhoff (1824–1887), physicist and spectroscopist
- Karl Rudolf König (1832–1901), physicist
- Franz Ernst Christian Neumann (1834–1918), pathologist
- Ernst Hugo Heinrich Pfitzer (1846–1906), botanist
- Otto Wallach (1847–1931), chemist, recipient of the 1910 Nobel Prize in Chemistry
- Hermann Eichhorst (1849–1921), physician
- Emanuel Kayser (1845–1927) geologist and palaeontologist
- Ernst Bessel Hagen (1851–1923), physicist
- Erich von Drygalski (1865–1949) geographer, geophysicist and polar scientist
- Siegfried Passarge (1866–1958), geographer
- Max Wien (1866–1938), physicist
- Arnold Sommerfeld (1868–1951), physicist, pioneered atomic and quantum physics
- Friedrich Adolf Paneth (1887–1958), chemist
- Fritz Albert Lipmann (1899–1986), biochemist, shared the 1953 Nobel Prize in Physiology or Medicine
- Rudolf Kaufmann (1909–c. 1941), palaeontologist and geologist,
- Arno Motulsky (1923–2018), medical geneticist

=== Mathematicians ===
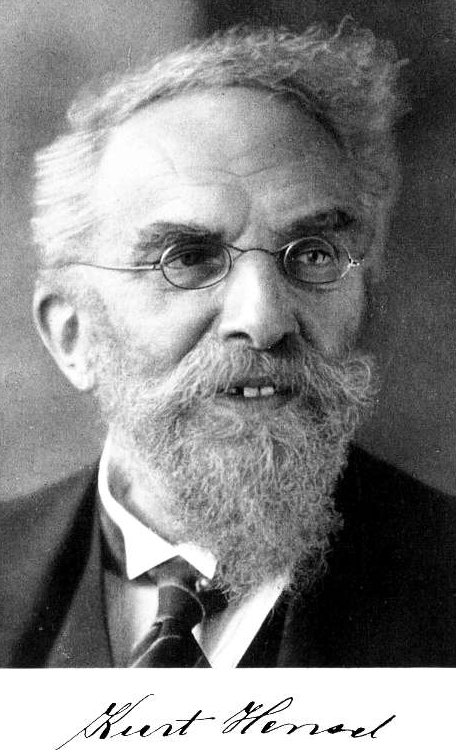
Kurt Hensel, 1925

- Christian Goldbach (1690–1764), mathematician, developed Goldbach's conjecture
- Carl Gustav Jacob Jacobi (1804–1851), mathematician, worked on elliptic functions, dynamics, differential equations
- Otto Hesse (1811–1874), mathematician, worked on algebraic invariants
- Carl Neumann (1832–1925), mathematician, worked on the Dirichlet principle
- Rudolf Lipschitz (1832–1903), mathematician, named the Lipschitz continuity condition
- Alfred Clebsch (1833–1872), mathematician, contributed to algebraic geometry
- Ludwig Scheeffer (1859–1885), mathematician, contributed to calculus
- Kurt Hensel (1861–1941), mathematician, introduced p-adic number
- David Hilbert (1862–1943), mathematician, developed invariant theory
- Hermann Minkowski (1864–1909), mathematician, developed the geometry of numbers
- Jürgen Moser (1928–1999), contributed to celestial mechanics, dynamical systems, functional analysis

== Arts and music ==
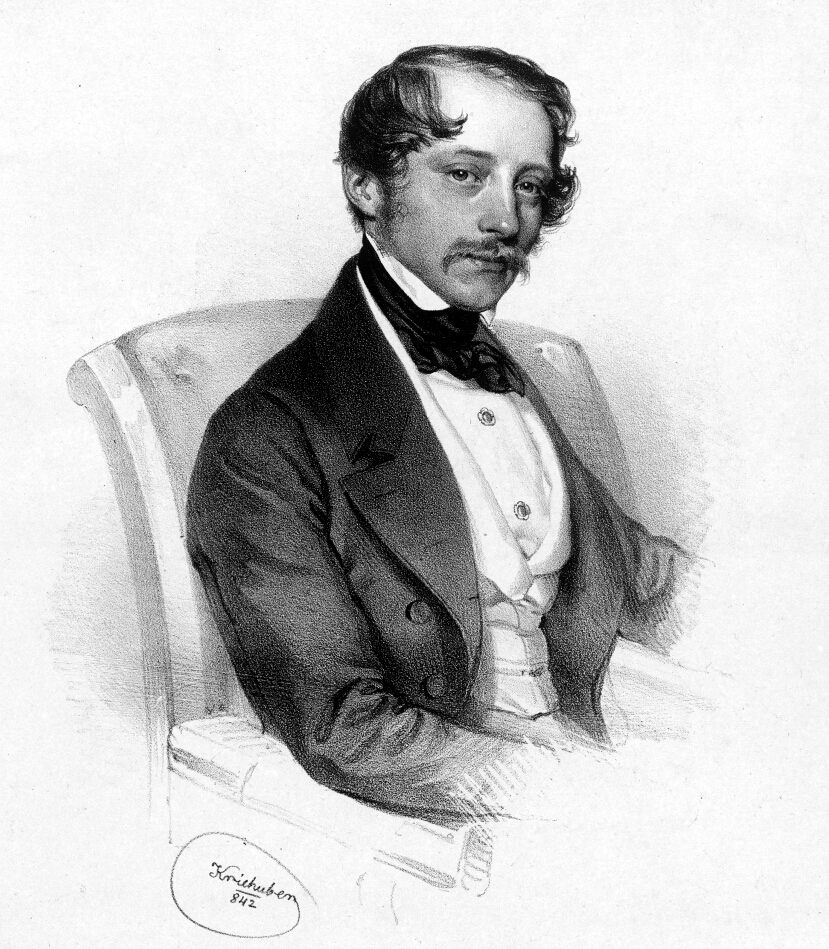
Otto Nicolai, 1842

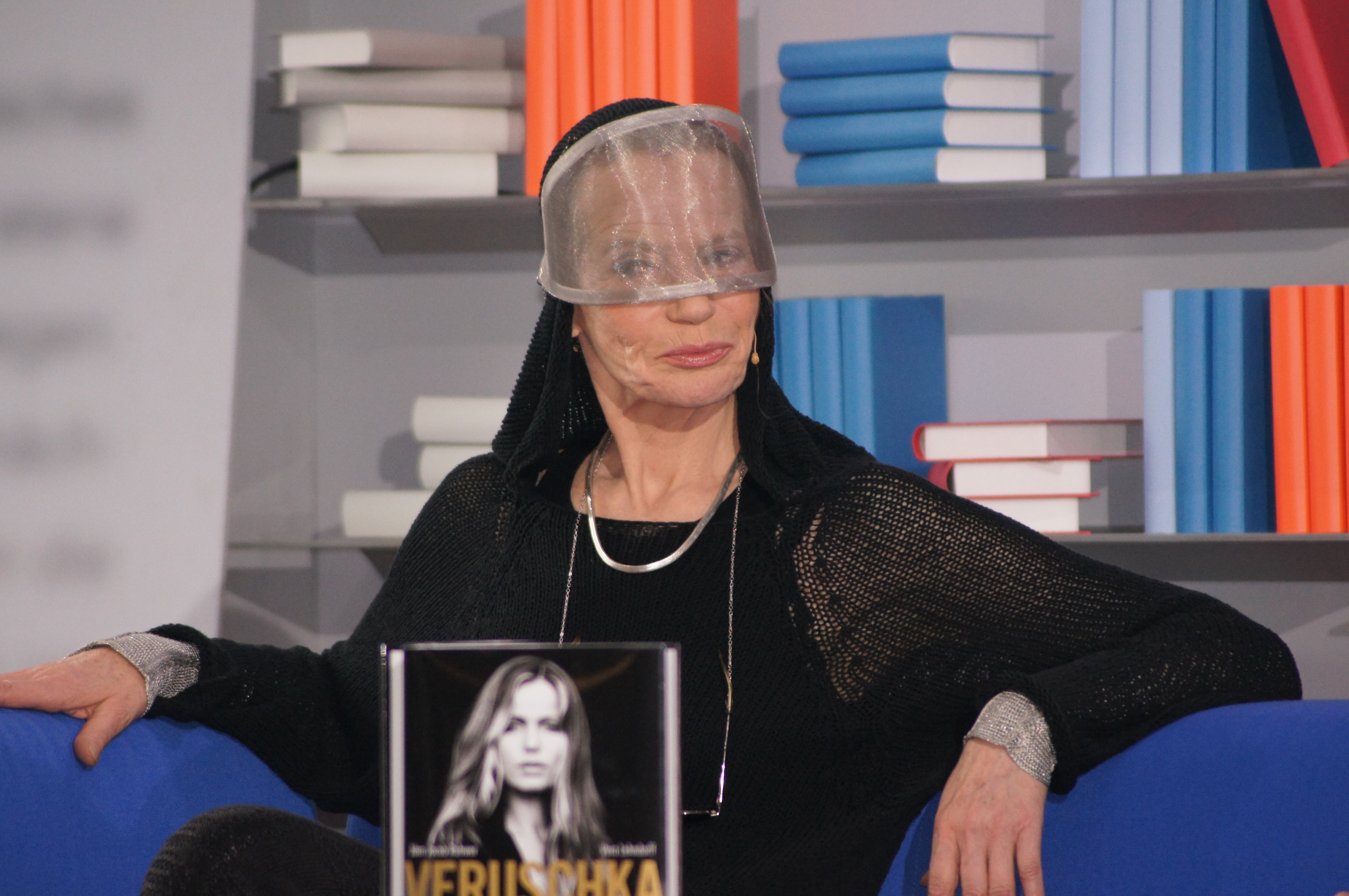
Veruschka Gräfin von Lehndorff, 2011

- Anton Möller (c.1563–1611), painter active mostly in Danzig (Gdańsk)
- August Kohn (1732–c.1801/2), violinist and composer active at the courts in Berlin
- Christian Wilhelm Podbielski (1741–1792), organist and composer
- Otto Nicolai (1810–1849), composer and conductor
- Rudolf Siemering (1835–1905) German sculptor
- Hermann Goetz (1840–1876) a composer of the 1872 opera Der Widerspänstigen Zähmung.
- Pavel Pabst (1854–1897), pianist/composer and professor at the Moscow Conservatory
- Käthe Kollwitz (1867–1945), painter and sculptor
- Ernst Behmer (1875–1938) a prolific German stage and film actor
- Werner Funck (1881–1951), actor, singer, and film director
- Harry Liedtke (1882–1945), actor
- Heinz Tiessen (1887–1971), composer
- Emy von Stetten (1898–1980), soprano
- Max Colpet (1905–1998), popular song lyricist
- Michael Wieck (1928–2021), musician and author
- Veruschka von Lehndorff (born 1939), model, actress and artist
- Eberhard Feltz (born 1937), German classical violinist
- Wilfried Gruhn (born 1939), German violinist, musicologist, music educator and emeritus professor

== Military ==
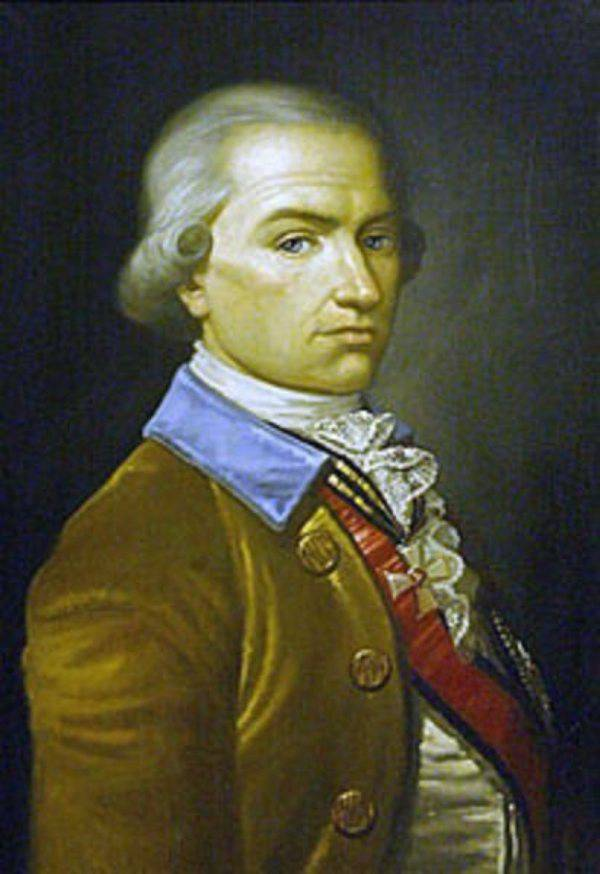
Peter August, Duke of Schleswig-Holstein-Sonderburg-Beck

- Erhard Ernst von Röder (1665–1743), Prussian field marshal
- Alexander von Dönhoff (1683–1742), Prussian lieutenant-general and confidant of King Friedrich Wilhelm I
- Peter August, Duke of Schleswig-Holstein-Sonderburg-Beck (1697–1775) Field Marshal in the Russian Imperial Army
- Friedrich von der Trenck (1726–1794), Prussian officer and adventurer
- Leopold von Rauch (1787–1860), Prussian general
- Prince Albert of Prussia (1809–1872) Generaloberst
- Karl von Wrangel (1812–1899), Prussian General of the Infantry in the First Schleswig War
- Max von der Goltz (1838–1906), Prussian admiral
- Ernst von Below (1863–1955), German general
- Hans Feige, (1880–1953), Wehrmacht general
- Heinrich zu Dohna-Schlobitten, (1882–1944), major general in the resistance and sentenced to death by the Volksgerichtshof
- Oskar von Hindenburg (1883–1960) a German Generalleutnant
- Wolff von Stutterheim (1893–1940) a German Generalmajor
- Werner Ostendorff (1903–1945), German SS Major General (Gruppenführer) of the 2nd SS Panzer Division Das Reich
- Heinrich Gerlach (1908–1991), German soldier in the 14th Panzer Division and author of The Forsaken Army
- Gerhard Barkhorn (1919–1983), second-highest-ranking Luftwaffe fighter ace (301 victories).
- Gideon Eilat (1924–2015), Israeli commander of the third battalion of the Yiftach Brigade during the 1947–1949 Palestine war

== Politicians ==
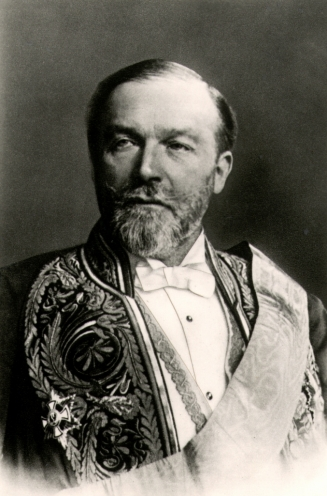
Philipp zu Eulenburg, 1895

- Johann Jacoby (1805–1877), politician
- Eduard von Simson (1810–1899), jurist and politician
- Otto Stellter (1823–1894), politician, member of German Reichstag
- Philipp, Prince of Eulenburg (1847–1921) diplomat and close friend of Wilhelm II
- Robert Rasch (1852–1938), a German settler in Nauru & first resident Administrator
- Otto Braun, (1872–1955), statesman and politician, Minister President of Prussia
- Wilhelm von Gayl (1879–1945), politician of the German National People's Party
- Carl Friedrich Goerdeler (1884–1945), a monarchist conservative politician
- Waldemar Magunia (1902–1974), Nazi Party politician and SA officer
- Karl-Hermann Flach (1929–1973) journalist at the Frankfurter Rundschau and FDP politician
- Christean Wagner (1943–2025), German politician

== Sport ==
- Eugen Sandow (1867–1925), first modern bodybuilder
- Lilli Henoch (1899–1942), world record holder in the discus, shot put, and 4 × 100 meters relay, shot as a Jew by a Nazi Einsatzgruppen death squad
- brothers Kraft Schepke (1934–2023) & Frank Schepke (1935–2017) German Olympic rowers

== Others ==
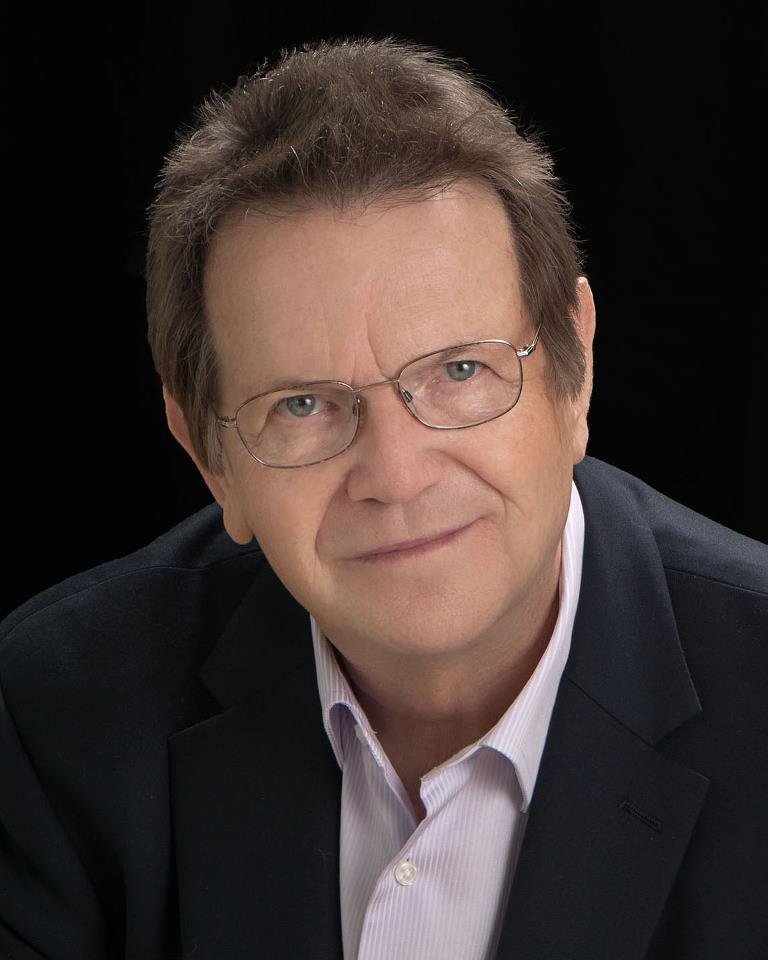
Reinhard Bonnke, 2014

- brothers Bruno Taut (1880–1938) & Max Taut (1884–1967), architects
- Moshe Smoira (1888–1961), first President of the Supreme Court of Israel
- Ehrenfried Günther Freiherr von Hünefeld (1892–1929) aviator, made the first east-west transatlantic flight in 1928
- Rabbi Josef Hirsch Dunner (1913–2007), Chief Rabbi of East Prussia 1936–1938
- Immanuel Jakobovits, Baron Jakobovits (1921–1999) Chief Rabbi of the United Hebrew Congregations of the Commonwealth, from 1967 to 1991
- Ulrich Schnaft (born 1923) Waffen-SS man in WWII, emigrated to Israel where he spied for Egypt
- Gerda Munsinger (1929–1998) an East German prostitute and alleged Soviet spy
- Thomas Eichelbaum (1931–2018), former Chief Justice of New Zealand
- Heinrich August Winkler (born 1938), historian, academic and author
- Reinhard Bonnke (1940–2019), televangelist, missionary in Africa from 1967

== See also ==
- List of Poles from Königsberg
