= Wilhelm Petersen =

Wilhelm Petersen may refer to:

- Wilhelm Petersen (composer) (1890–1957), German composer and conductor
- Wilhelm Petersen (entomologist) (1854–1933), Estonian entomologist and lepidopterist
- Wilhelm Petersén (ice hockey) (1906–1988), Swedish ice hockey player

== See also ==
- Vilhelm Petersen, Danish architect
