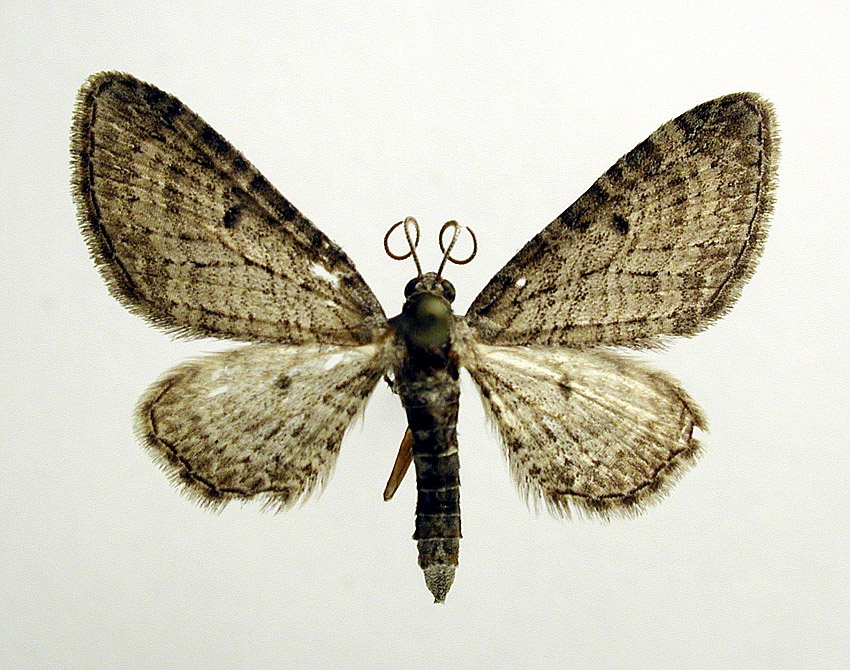

Scientific classification
- Kingdom: Animalia
- Phylum: Arthropoda
- Clade: Pancrustacea
- Class: Insecta
- Order: Lepidoptera
- Family: Geometridae
- Genus: Eupithecia
- Species: E. orphnata

Binomial name
- Eupithecia orphnata W. Petersen, 1909

= Eupithecia orphnata =

Species of moth

Eupithecia orphnata is a moth of the family Geometridae. It is found from northern Europe to Anatolia.

The wingspan is 17–21 mm. There is one generation per year with adults on wing from mid June to mid July.

The larvae feed on a wide range of plants, including Quercus robur, Rumex crispus, Silene cucubalus v. litoralis, Angelica archangelica v. litoralis, Veronica longifolia, Galium verum, Valeriana officinalis, Artemisia vulgaris, Artemisia campestris and Sonchus arvensis. Larvae can be found from July to August. It overwinters as a pupa.

== Subspecies ==
- Eupithecia orphnata orphnata Petersen, 1909
- Eupithecia orphnata ferganata Schutze, 1956 (West Siberian plain and Kazakhstan)
