= Catoptria permiacus =

Scientific classification
- Kingdom: Animalia
- Phylum: Arthropoda
- Clade: Pancrustacea
- Class: Insecta
- Order: Lepidoptera
- Family: Crambidae
- Genus: Catoptria
- Species: C. permiacus

Binomial name
- Catoptria permiacus (W. Petersen, 1924)

Synonyms
- Crambus permiacus W. Petersen, 1924; Catoptria permiaca; Crambus antipenellus Inoue, 1955; Crambus antipinellus Inoue, 1955

Species of moth

Catoptria permiacus is a species of moth in the family Crambidae described by Wilhelm Petersen in 1924. It is found in Poland, the Baltic region, Finland, European Russia, the Russian Far East (Amur, Ussuri), China (Manchuria, Sichuan), Korea and Japan. It has a wingspan of about 20 mm.
