= Podbielski =

Podbielski is a surname. Notable people with the name include:

- Christian Wilhelm Podbielski (1740–1792), German organist and composer
- Eugen Anton Theophil von Podbielski (1814–1879), Prussian Army general
- Victor von Podbielski (1844-1916), Prussian politician and military officer
- Viktor von Podbielski (1892-1945), German politician, mayor of Frankfurt (Oder) 1943-1945
