= Siegessäulen =

Pair of statues on columns in Berlin, Germany

Coordinates: 52°31′17″N 13°17′56″E

Zwei Siegessäulen
- English: Two Victory Columns
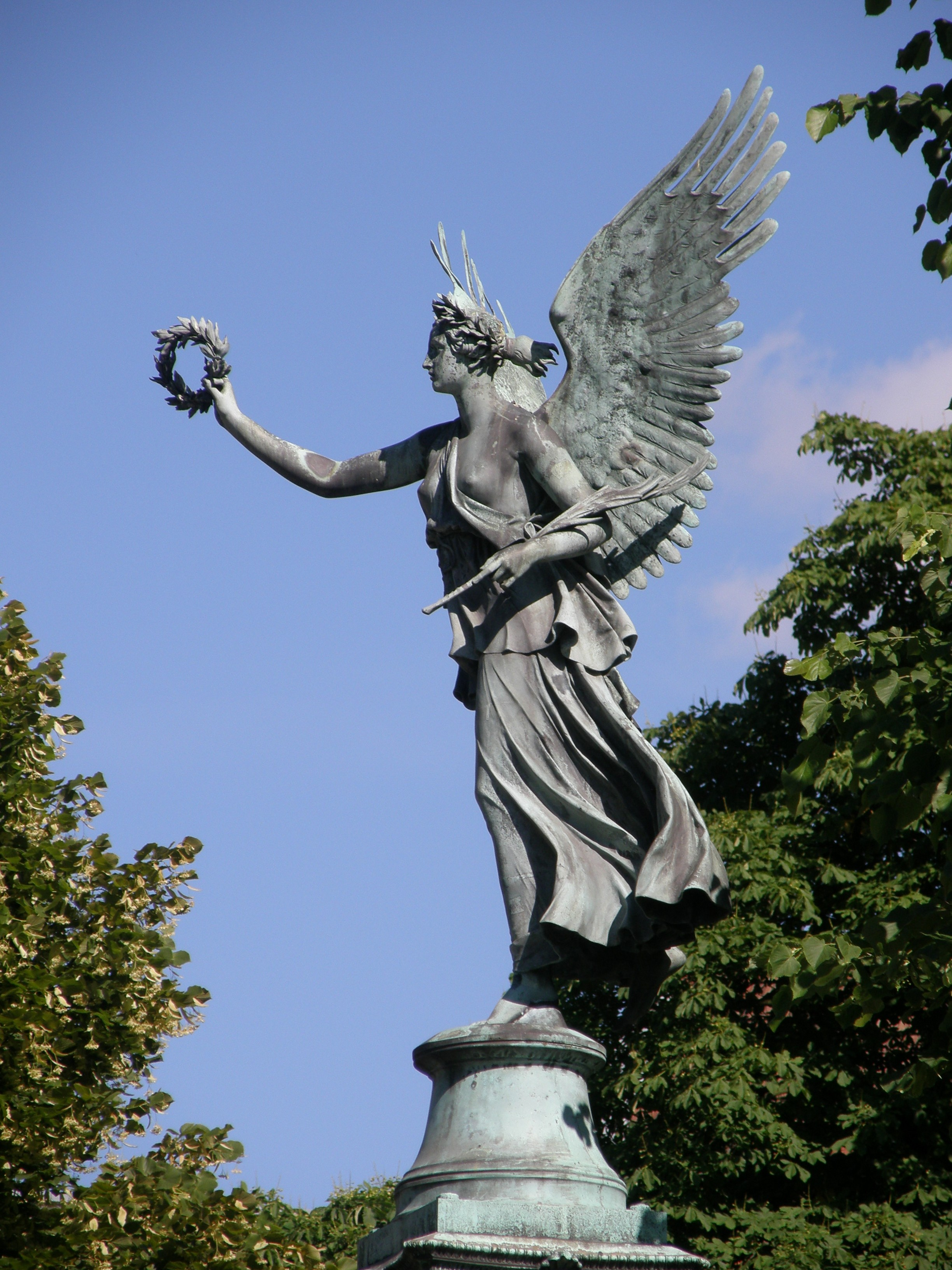
- Subject: Victoria
- Location: Berlin, Germany

The two Siegessäulen (English: Two Victory Columns) is a pair of outdoor columns surmounted by bronze statues of Victoria, the goddess of victory. They were made in 1840 by the German sculptor Christian Daniel Rauch and installed in the park of Charlottenburg Palace in Berlin, Germany, in front of the west façade of the Neuer Pavillon.

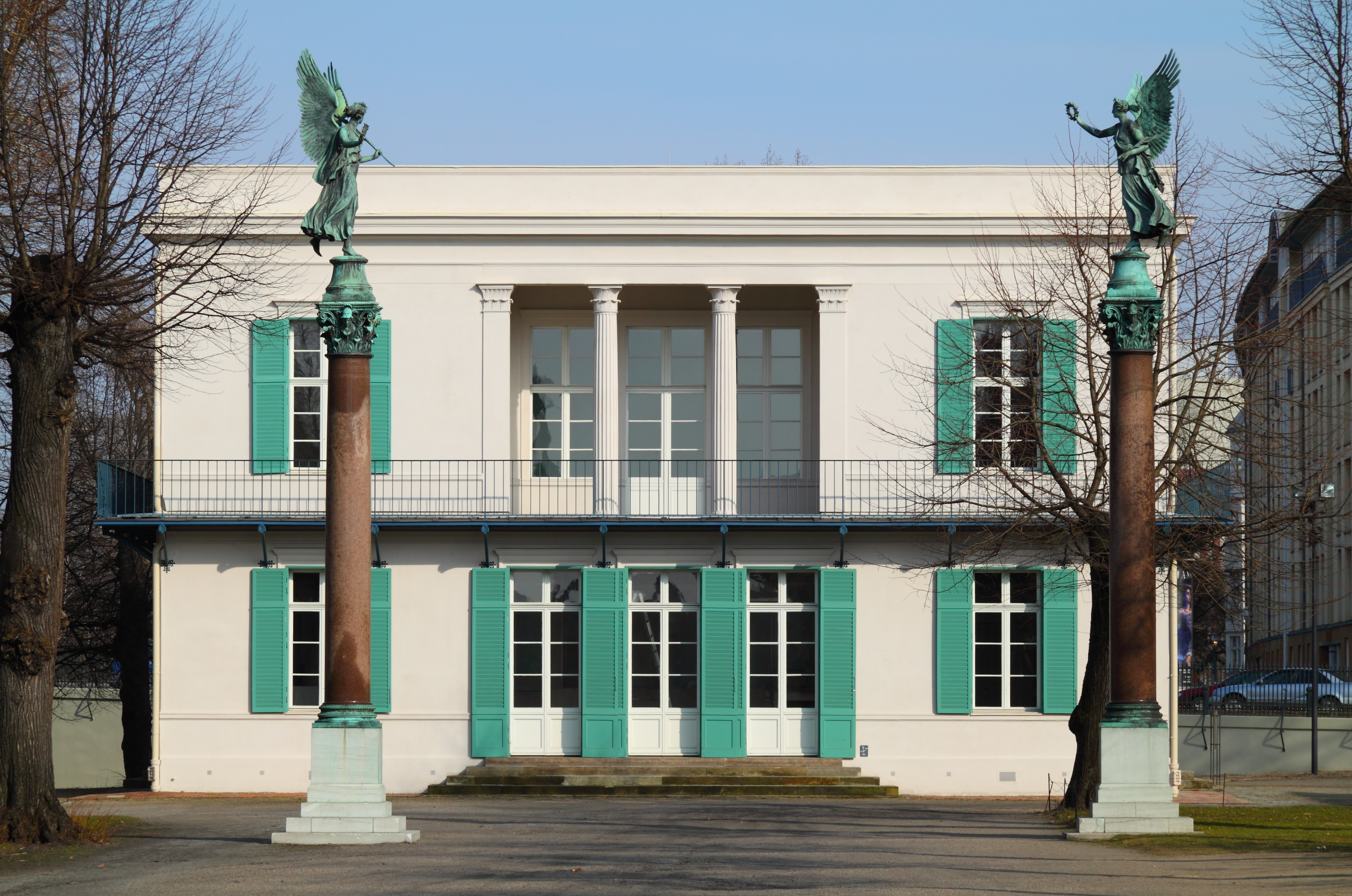
The victory columns in front of the Neuer Pavillon

== See also ==
- 1840 in art
