= University of Königsberg =

Former university in Königsberg, East Prussia (1544–1945)

- Albertus-Universität Königsberg
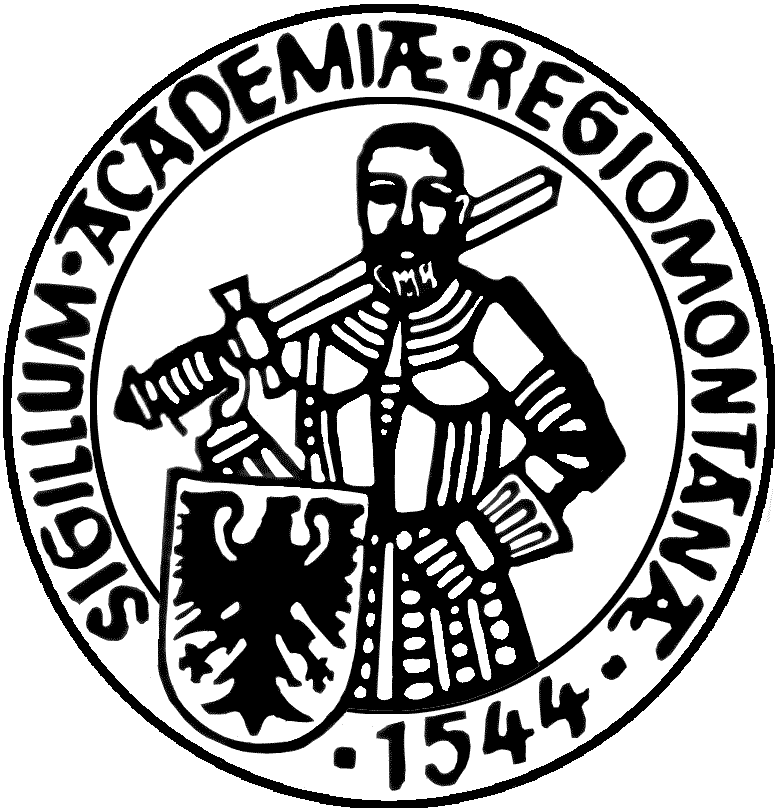
- Latin: Universitas Albertina; Academia Regiomontana
- Type: Public
- Active: 1544–1945
- Founders: Albert, Duke in Prussia (1544); Sigismund II Augustus, King of Poland (1560)
- Rector: Georg Sabinus 1544–1547 (first)
- Location: Königsberg, Prussia; 54°42′50″N 20°30′36″E
- Campus: Urban

The University of Königsberg (German: Albertus-Universität Königsberg), commonly known as Albertina, was a university in Königsberg, East Prussia. It was founded in 1544 as the world's second Protestant academy (after the University of Marburg) by Duke Albert of Prussia and received the royal privilege by King Sigismund II Augustus of Poland in 1560.

Following World War II, the city of Königsberg (renamed Kaliningrad) was transferred to the Soviet Union under the terms of the 1945 Potsdam Agreement. The Albertina was closed and the remaining German population was expelled. Today, the Immanuel Kant Baltic Federal University claims to maintain the traditions of the Albertina.

== History ==
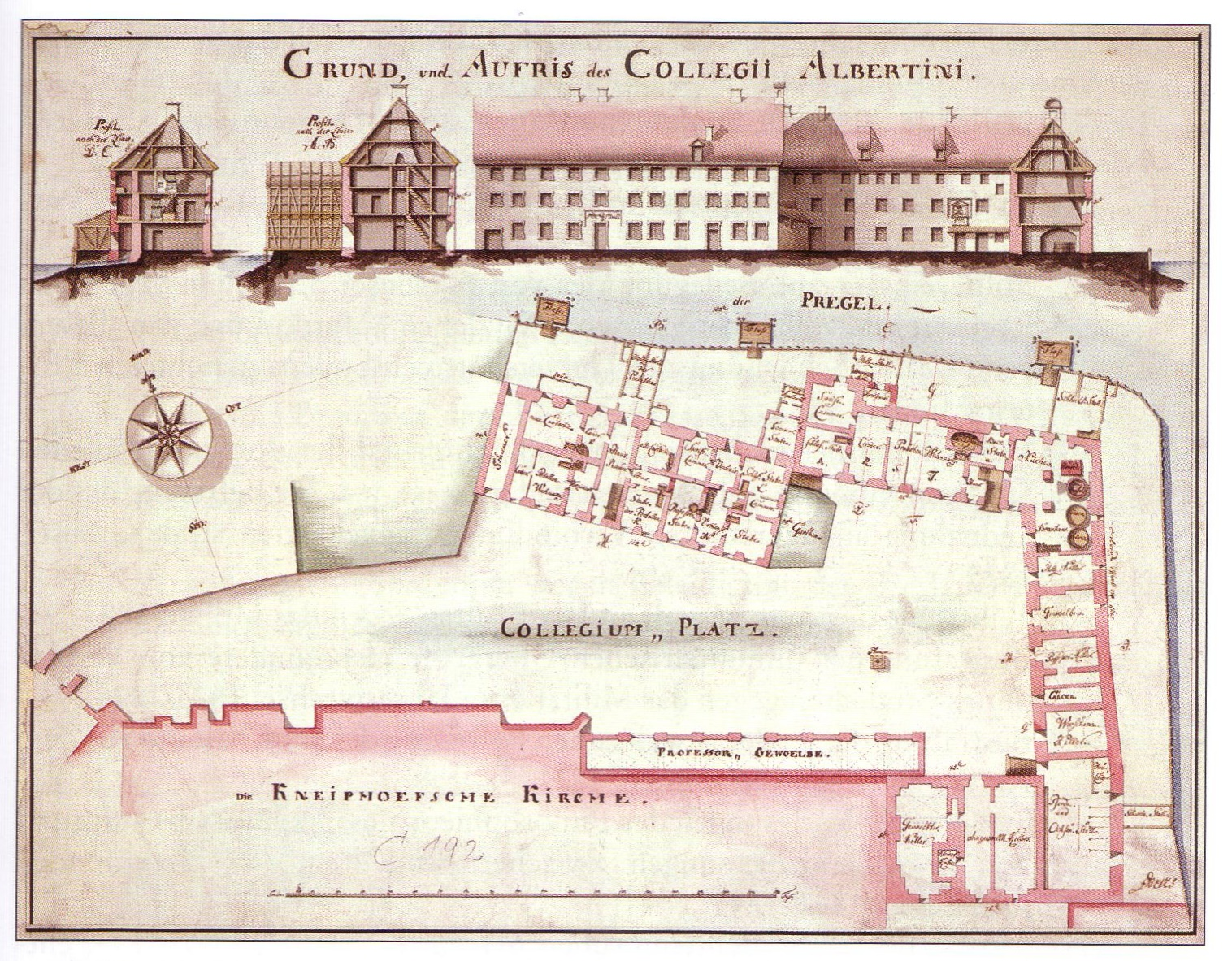
Elevation of the Albertinum and the northern half of the cathedral , c. 1810

Albert, former Grand Master of the Teutonic Order and first Duke of Prussia since 1525, had purchased a piece of land behind Königsberg Cathedral on the Kneiphof island of the Pregel River from the Samland chapter, where he had an academic gymnasium (school) erected in 1542. He issued the deed of foundation of the Collegium Albertinum on 20 July 1544, after which the university was inaugurated on 17 August.

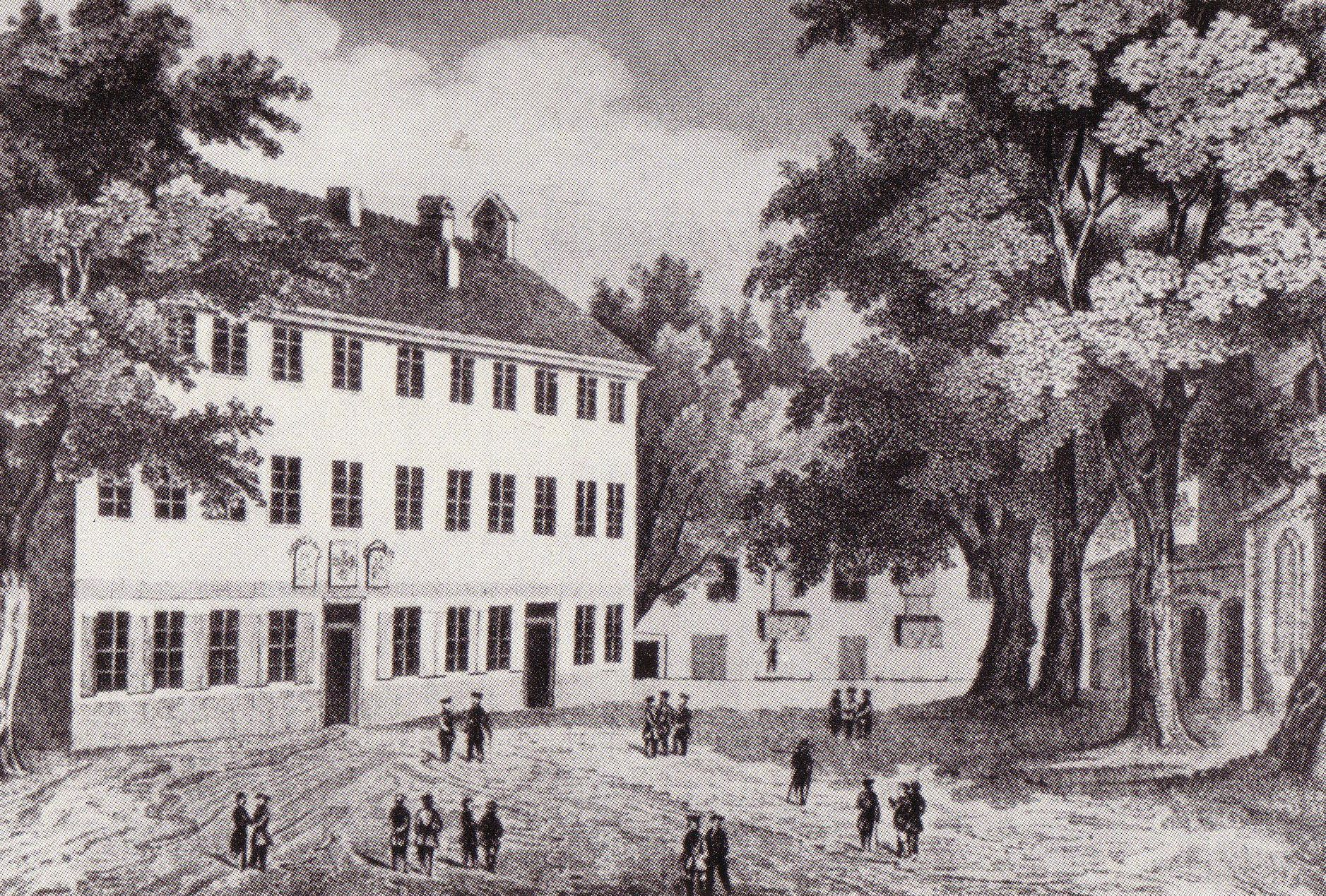
Collegium Albertinum, c. 1850

The newly established Protestant duchy was a fiefdom of the Crown of the Kingdom of Poland and the university served as a Lutheran counterpart to the Catholic Kraków Academy. Its first rector was the poet Georg Sabinus, son-in-law of Philipp Melanchthon. Lithuanian scholars Stanislovas Rapalionis and Abraomas Kulvietis were among the first professors of university. All professors had to take an oath on the Augsburg Confession. Since the Prussian lands lay beyond the borders of the Holy Roman Empire, both Emperor Charles V and Pope Paul III withheld their approval, nevertheless the Königsberg academy was granted the royal privilege by King Sigismund II Augustus of Poland on 28 March 1560.

From 1618 the Prussian duchy was ruled in personal union by the Margraves of Brandenburg and in 1657 the "Great Elector" Frederick William of Brandenburg finally acquired full sovereignty over Prussia from Poland by the Treaty of Wehlau. The Albertina was the second oldest university (after the University of Frankfurt (Oder)) and intellectual centre of Protestant Brandenburg-Prussia. Initially it comprised four colleges: Theology, Medicine, Philosophy and Law, later also natural sciences. Subsequent rectors included numerous Hohenzollern Prussian royals (at last Crown Prince William 1908–1918), who had never been to the university, usually represented by a prorector in charge of academic affairs.

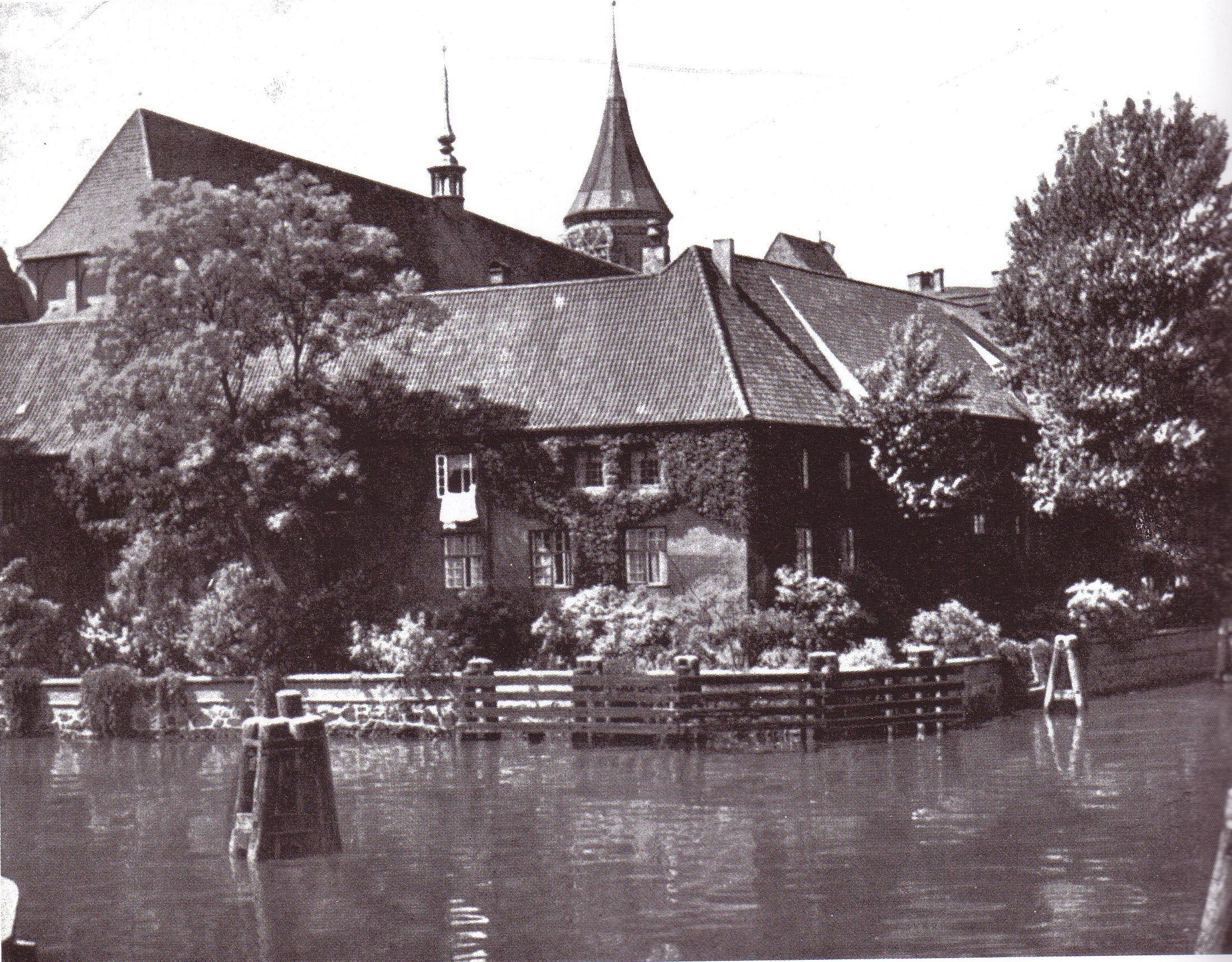
Backside of the Collegium Albertinum in Kneiphof, where Kant taught. The quarter was destroyed in World War II.

The Prussian lands remained unharmed by the disastrous Thirty Years' War, which gained the Königsberg university an increasing popularity among students. In the 17th century, it was known as a home to Simon Dach, serving as rector in 1656/57, and his fellow poets. Tsar Peter I of Russia visited the Albertina in 1697, leading to increased contacts between Prussia and the Russian Empire. Large numbers of Petrine officials trooped the university to cameralist theory and administrative practices which thus shaped Russia's government. Notable Russian students at Königbserg were Kirill Razumovsky, later president of the Russian Academy of Sciences and General Mikhail Andreyevich Miloradovich. The university and the city had profound impact on the development of Lithuanian culture. The first book in Lithuanian language was printed here in 1547 and several important Lithuanian writers attended the Albertina. The university was also the preferred educational institution of the Baltic German nobility.

The 18th century is known in cultural history as the "Königsberg Century" of Enlightenment, a heyday initiated by the Albertina student Johann Christoph Gottsched and continued by the philosopher Johann Georg Hamann and writer Theodor Gottlieb von Hippel the Elder. Notable alumni were Johann Gottfried Herder, Zacharias Werner, Johann Friedrich Reichardt, E. T. A. Hoffmann, and foremost the philosopher Immanuel Kant, rector in 1786 and 1788. These scholars laid the foundations for the later Weimar Classicism and German Romanticism movements.

The Albertina's magnificent botanical garden was inaugurated in 1811 during the Napoleonic Wars. Two years later, Friedrich Wilhelm Bessel established his outstanding observatory next door to the garden. Other university professors included such giants of the science world as the philosopher Johann Gottlieb Fichte (1806–07), the biologist Karl Ernst von Baer (1817–34), the mathematician Carl Gustav Jacobi (1829–42), the mineralogist Franz Ernst Neumann (1828–76) and the physicist Hermann von Helmholtz (1849–55).

In the 19th and 20th centuries, the university was most famous for its school of mathematics, founded by Carl Gustav Jacob Jacobi, and continued by his pupils Ludwig Otto Hesse, Friedrich Richelot, Johann G. Rosenhain and Philipp Ludwig von Seidel. It was later associated with the names of Hermann Minkowski (Albert Einstein's teacher), Adolf Hurwitz, Ferdinand von Lindemann and David Hilbert, who was one of the greatest modern mathematicians. The mathematicians Alfred Clebsch and Carl Gottfried Neumann (both born in Königsberg and educated under Ludwig Otto Hesse) founded the Mathematische Annalen in 1868, which soon became the most influential mathematical journal of the time.

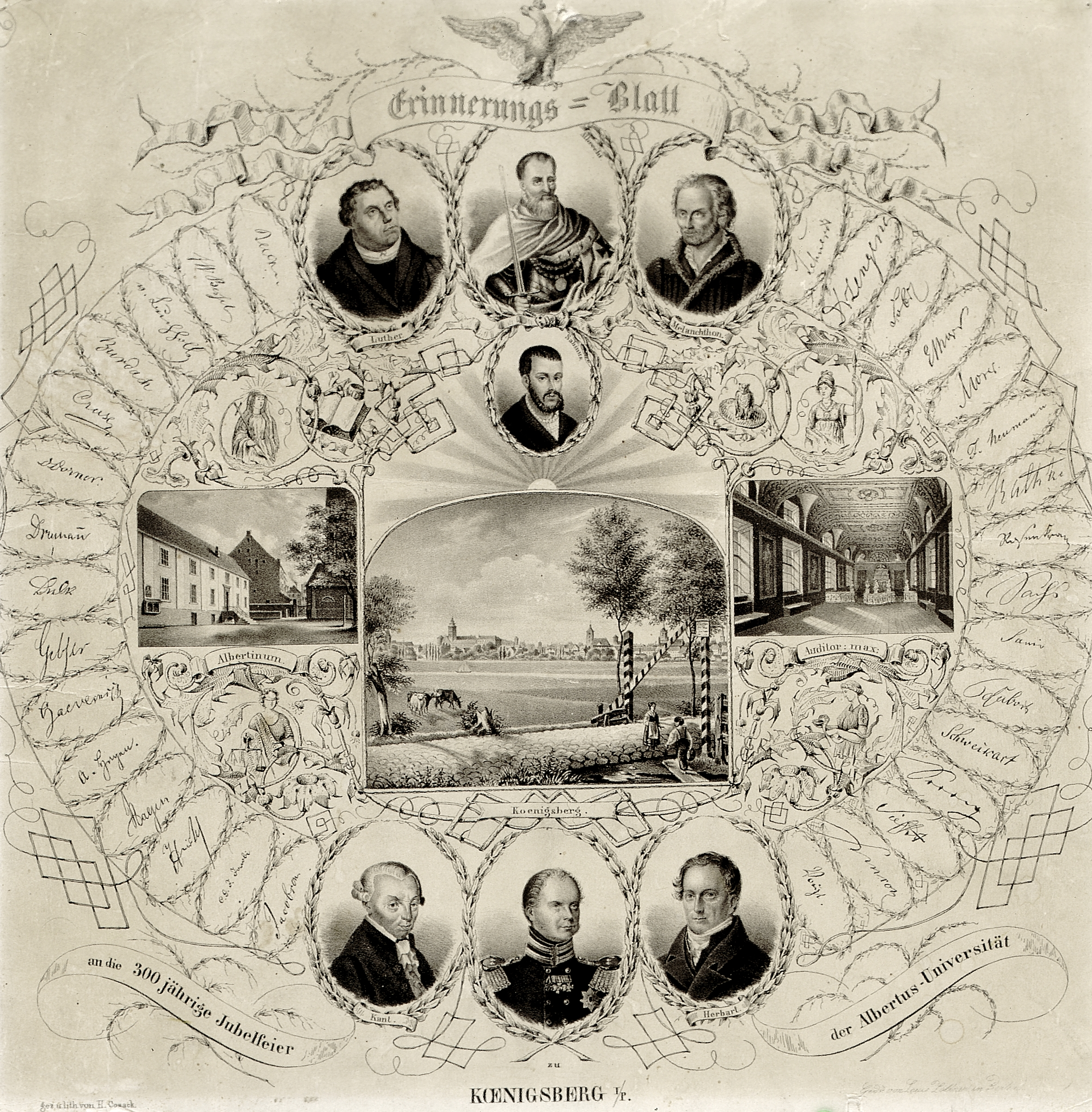
The 300th anniversary of the University of Königsberg. Includes an interior view of the auditorium maximum, c. 1844

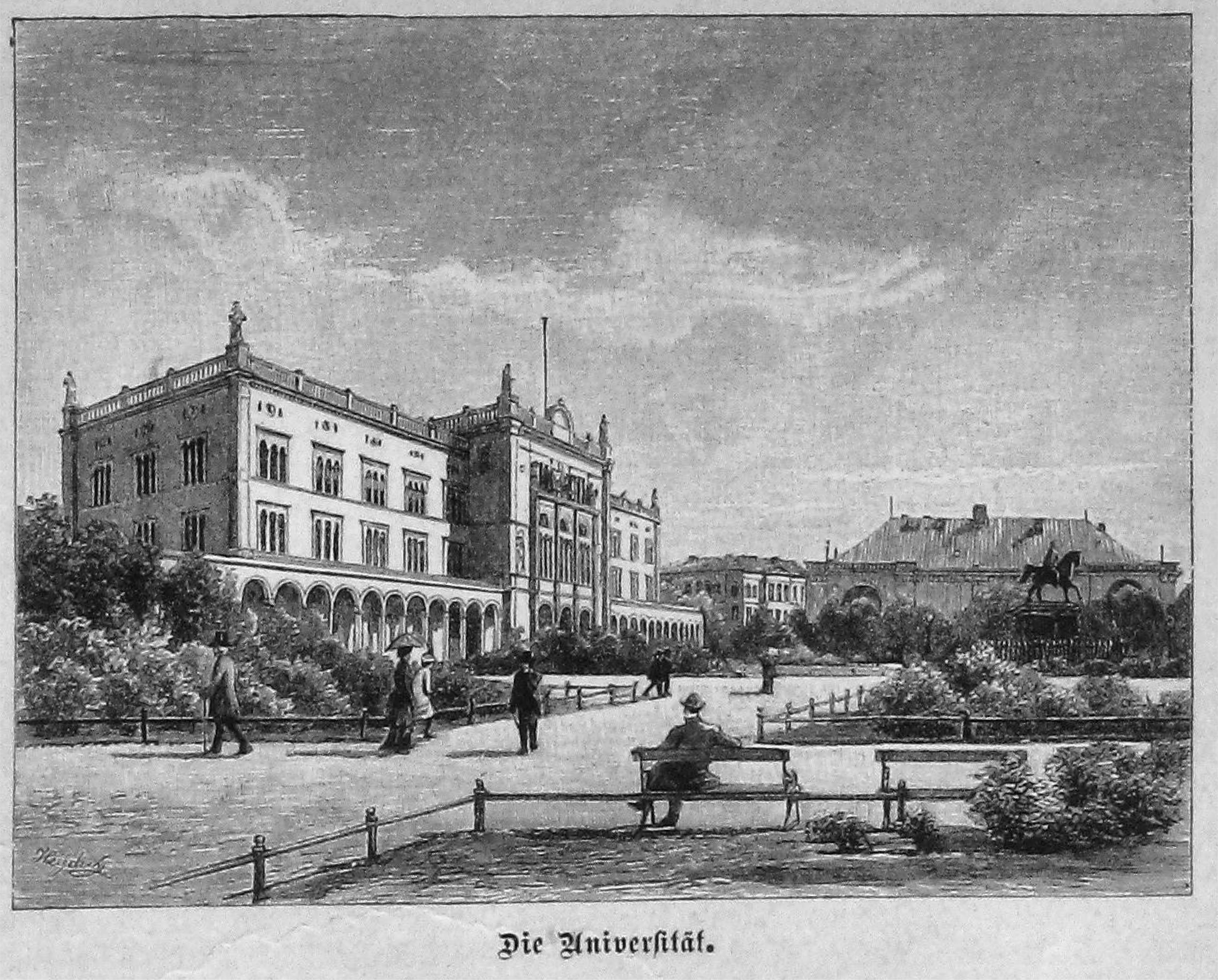
The Garden Arbor outside the University Building, c. 1890

Celebrating the university's 300 years jubilee on 31 August 1844, King Frederick William IV of Prussia laid the foundation for the new main building of the Albertina, which was inaugurated in 1862 by Crown Prince Frederick William and Prorector Johann Karl Friedrich Rosenkranz. The building on central Paradeplatz was erected in a neo-Renaissance style according to plans designed by Friedrich August Stüler. The facade was adorned by an equestrian figure in relief of Albert of Prussia. Below it were niches containing statues of the Protestant reformers Martin Luther and Philipp Melanchthon. Inside was a handsome staircase, borne by marble columns. The Senate Hall contained a portrait of Emperor Frederick III by Lauchert and a bust of Immanuel Kant by Hagemann, a student of Schadow. The adjacent hall ("Aula") was adorned with frescoes painted in 1870. The university library was situated on Mitteltragheim in 1901 and contained over 230,000 volumes. On Dritte Fliess Strasse was the Palästra Albertina, established in 1898 for the encouragement of the higher forms of sport among the students and citizens. Nearby were the government offices, adorned with mural paintings by Knorr and Schmidt. In 1900, the university had 900 students.

The Albertina faculty and the German Student Union after the territorial separation of the Province of East Prussia by the Treaty of Versailles stressed its affiliation with the Reich, pushing intellectual life towards German nationalism. On 10 July 1944, the university celebrated its 400th anniversary in presence of Reich Minister Walther Funk. A few weeks later, during the nights of 26/27 and 29/30 August, Königsberg was extensively bombed by the Royal Air Force. From January to April 1945 the city was further devastated by the East Prussian Offensive of the Red Army and the final Battle of Königsberg. When General Otto Lasch signed the capitulation on 9 April, the historic inner city was destroyed by the attacks, and 80% of the university campus lay in ruins. The faculty had fled, many of them were received at the University of Göttingen.

In 1947, the university, already under new leadership, resumed work, but now as the Kaliningrad State Pedagogical Institute (KSPI).

The rebuilt main building of the Albertina is now part of the Immanuel Kant University. Its facade is very different from what it was in German times.

Which in 1967 received the status of a Kaliningrad State University.

Immanuel Kant Baltic Federal University remembers its continuity from the University of Koenigsberg ("Albertina"), preserving the best traditions of the university.

== Notable alumni and faculty ==
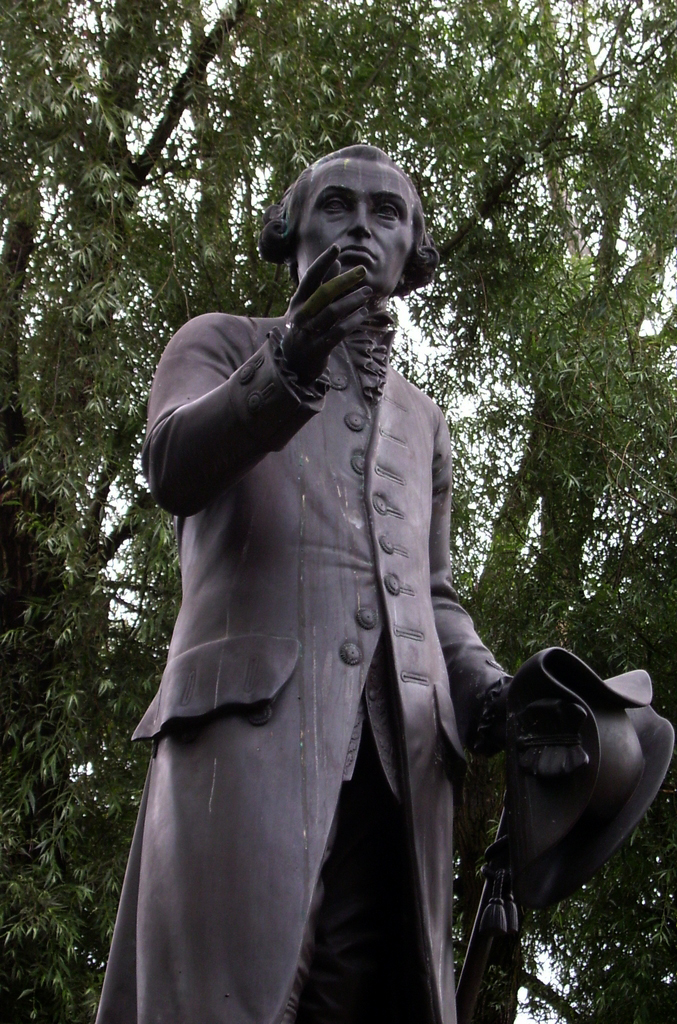
Monument to Immanuel Kant next to the building of building No. 3 of the I. Kant BFU (Universitetskaya Street, house 2, Kaliningrad, Russia). Harald Haake (opened 27 June 1992) is an exact replica of the original sculpture by Christian Daniel Rauch (1867), which disappeared during World War II.

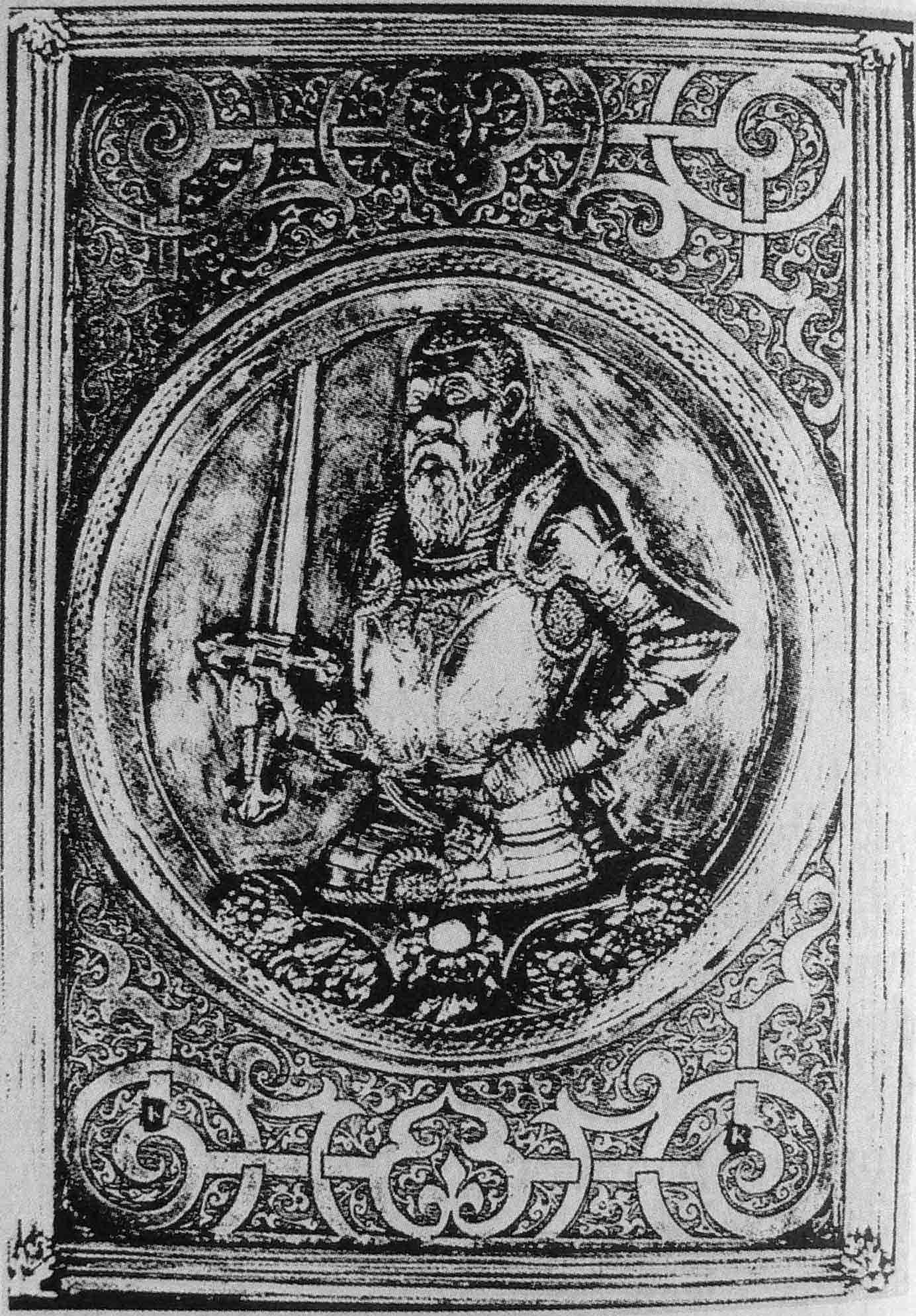
Albert of Prussia on the book cover on one of the books of the famous Silberbibliothek ("silver library") which was part of the university library. Like the equally famous Wallenrodt library it is lost since 1945.

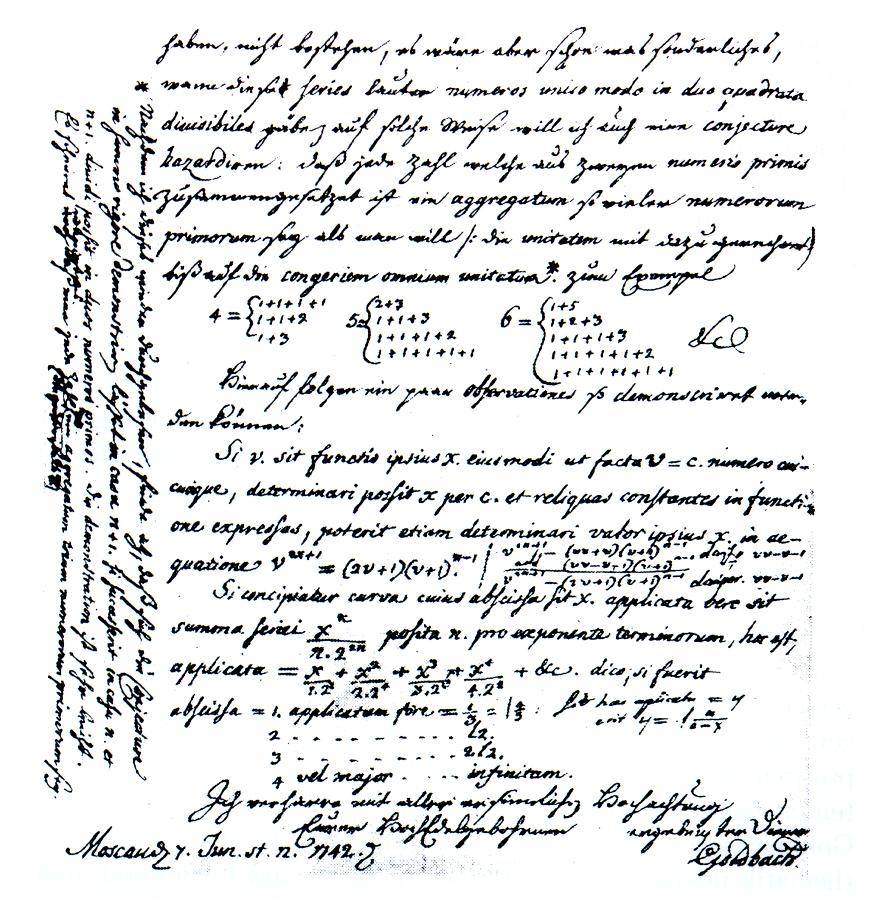
A letter from Christian Goldbach to Leonhard Euler. Mathematician Goldbach is one of the university's notable alumni.

- Abraomas Kulvietis
- Adolf Hurwitz
- Adolph Eduard Grube
- Arnold Sommerfeld
- Carl Gustav Jacob Jacobi
- Christian Goldbach (1690–1764), mathematician
- Daniel Klein
- Daniel Lorenz Salthenius (1701–1750), theologian
- David Hilbert
- E. T. A. Hoffmann
- Emil Johann Wiechert
- Eva Johnston
- Ewald Christian von Kleist
- Friedrich Ludwig Zacharias Werner
- Friedrich Wilhelm Bessel
- Gábor Szegő
- Gotthilf Heinrich Ludwig Hagen
- Gustav Kirchhoff
- Hermann von Helmholtz
- Hermann Minkowski
- Hugo Blümner (1844–1919), classical archaeologist and philologist
- Immanuel Kant
- Jan Kochanowski
- Johann Christoph Bohl (1703–1785)
- Johann Friedrich Hartknoch (1740-1789), Enlightenment book publisher
- Johann Friedrich Herbart
- Johann Gottfried Herder
- Karl Ernst von Baer
- Karl Rudolf König
- Kristijonas Donelaitis (1714–1780), Lutheran pastor and poet
- Martynas Mažvydas
- Moshe Novomeysky
- Rudolf Gottschall
- Ruth Moufang
- Adolph Moses Radin (1848–1909), rabbi
- Solomon Schonfeld (Rabbi)
- Theodor Kaluza
- Theophilus Siegfried Bayer

== Honorary doctors ==
- Agnes Miegel
- Wilhelm Petersen
- Karl Weierstrass
- Franz Liszt

== See also ==
- List of early modern universities in Europe
- University of Königsberg alumni
- Academic staff of the University of Königsberg
