= Christian Wilhelm Podbielski =

German organist and composer

Christian Wilhelm Podbielski (1741–1792) was a Polish-born German organist and composer, who worked at the Evangelical cathedral in Königsberg, Germany, during the Classical period (music). He was born in Königsberg. He studied Evangelical theology at the University of Königsberg, where he later also taught music. Ernst Theodor Amadeus Hoffmann was his music student.
