= Johann Christoph Bohl =

German physician (1703–1785)

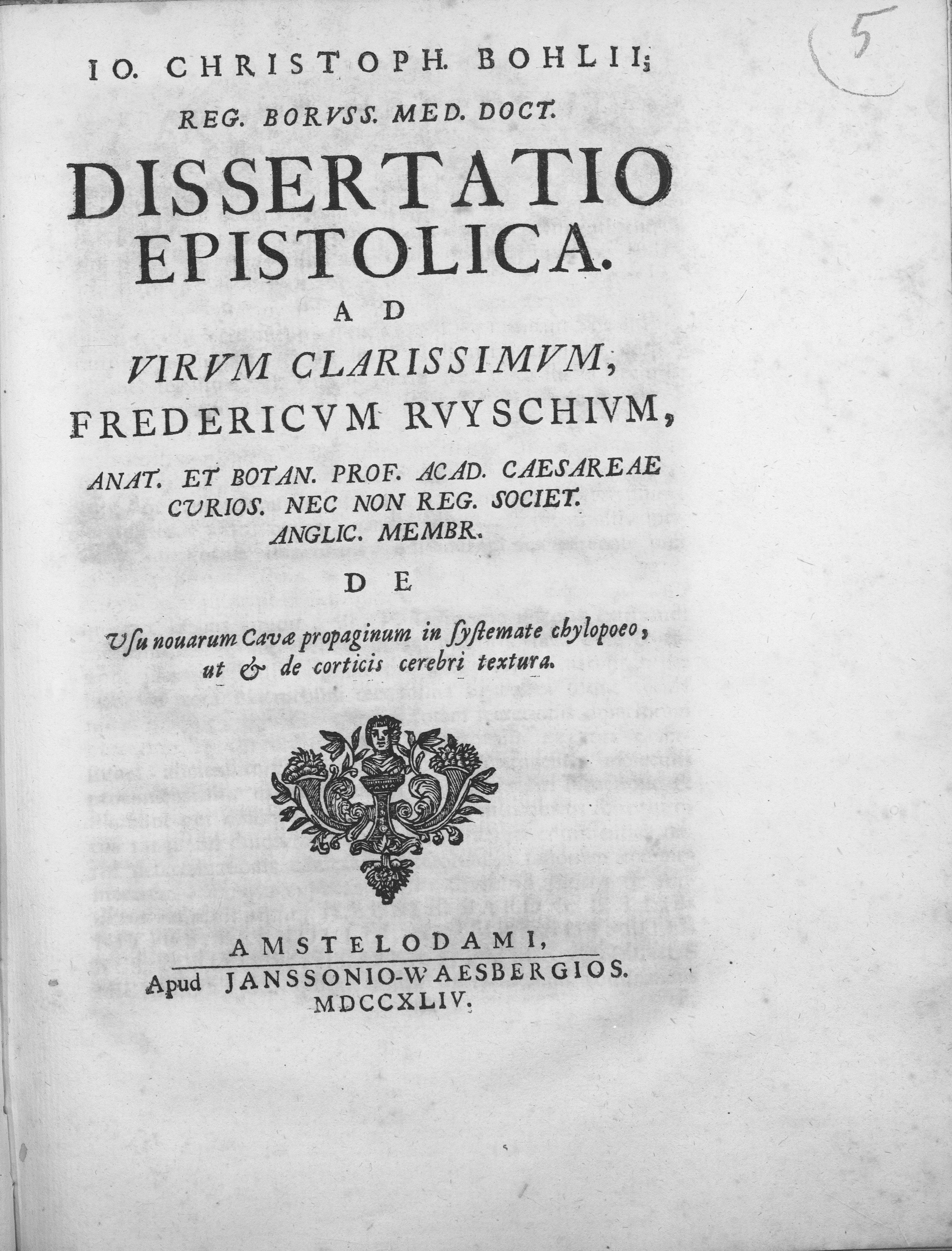
Dissertatio epistolica, 1744

Johann Christoph Bohl or Bohlius or Bohle (1703–1785) was a physician from the Kingdom of Prussia.

== Life ==
Born in Königsberg in 1703, Bohl enrolled at the local university on September 25, 1719, in order to study medicine, and continued his studies at the University of Leipzig. On September 20, 1725, he enrolled at the University of Leiden where he became a student of Herman Boerhaave, and a classmate of Albrecht von Haller. He graduated on 26 July 1726 presenting his dissertation titled "De morsu". He spent four years in Amsterdam working with the Dutch anatomist Frederik Ruysch. He returned to Königsberg on August 15, 1730. On September 23, 1741, he became professor of medicine at the Medical Faculty of the Königsberg College and a royal Prussian physician. Following the death of Melchior Philipp Hartmann, he took over his position and then became rector. Bohl is known as the sponsor of Immanuel Kant, whom he also financially supported during his time at the Collegium Fridericianum. Kant dedicated his first book, Thoughts on the True Estimation of Living Forces, to Bohl.

== Works ==
- Fr. Ruyschii observat. anat. de musculo in fundo uteri detecto; latinitate donata. Amsterdam 1726
- Bohl, Johann Christoph (1744). Dissertatio epistolica de usu novarum cavae propaginum in systemate chylopoeo (in Latin). Amstelodami: apud Janssonio-Waesbergios.
- Medicamenta lithontriptica anglicana revisa.Königsberg 1741
- Diss. exhibens medicamenta lithotriptica Anglicana revisa. Königsberg 1741
- Diss. sistens historiam naturalem viae lacteae corporis humani, per extispicia animalium olim detectae, nunc insolito ductu chylifero genuino auctae, cum notis criticis necessariisque commentariis ad placita Ruyschiana et Boerhaviana. Königsberg 1741
- Diss. super nervorum actione ex collisione. Königsberg 1762
- Progr. de insensibilitate tendinum. Königsberg 1764
- Progr. de virium corporis humani scrutinio medico. Königsberg 1766
- Von der nöthigen Vorsichtigkeit bey denen in lebendigen Geschöpfen anzustellenden Erfahrungen von der Unempfindlickkeit der Sehnen. Königsberg 1767
- Progr. de lacte aberrante. Königsberg 1772
