= Zacharias Werner =

German poet and preacher (1768–1823)

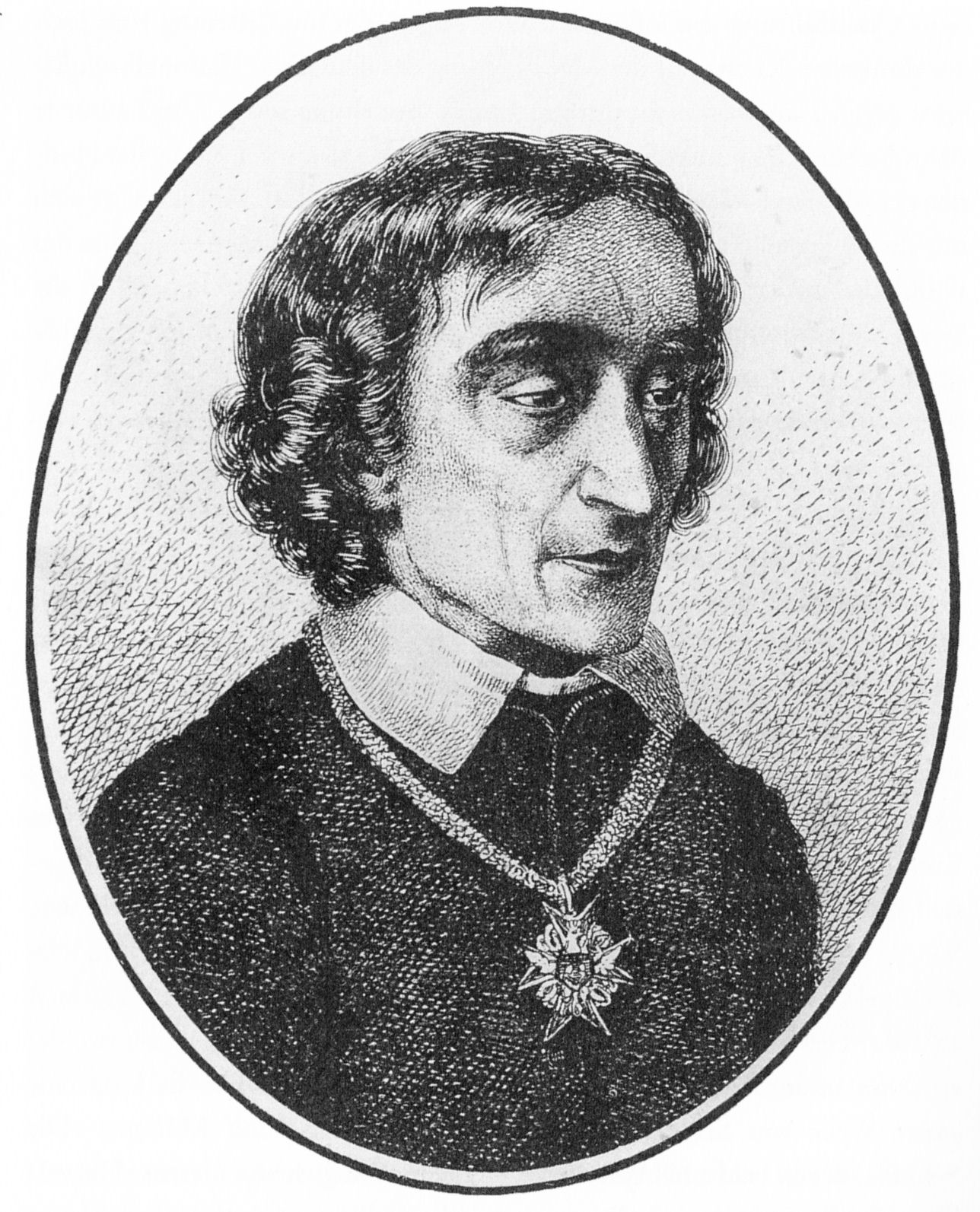
Etching of Werner by Johann Ender

Friedrich Ludwig Zacharias Werner (18 November 1768 – 17 January 1823) was a German poet, dramatist, and preacher. As a dramatist, he is known mainly for inaugurating the era of the so-called "tragedies of fate".

== Biography ==
Werner was born in Königsberg in East Prussia. At the University of Königsberg, he studied law and attended Kant's lectures. Jean-Jacques Rousseau and Rousseau's German disciples were also influences that shaped his view of life. He lived an irregular life and entered a series of unsuccessful marriages. However his talent was soon recognized, and in 1793 he became chamber secretary in the Prussian service in Warsaw. In 1805 he obtained a government post in Berlin, but two years later he retired from the public service in order to travel.

In the course of his travels, and by correspondence, Werner became acquainted with many eminent literary figures of the time, for example Goethe at Weimar and Madame de Staël at Coppet. At Rome, he joined the Roman Catholic Church in 1811. He was consecrated a priest in 1814 at Aschaffenburg, and, exchanging the pen for the pulpit, became a popular preacher in Vienna, where, during a congress in 1814, his eloquent sermons were listened to by crowded congregations. He was later appointed head of the chapter of the cathedral of Kamieniec.

Werner died in Vienna.

== Works ==
He succeeded in having his plays put on the stage, where they met with much success. Verdi's opera Attila is based on Werner's drama of the same name. Werner's Der 24. Februar, thus titled because his mother and an intimate friend died on that day, introduced the era of the so-called "tragedies of fate." Several of his dramatic poems were designed to evangelize freemasonry. His dramatic duology published in English as The Templars in Cyprus and The Brethren of the Cross was based on the idea that some survivors of the Templar suppression escaped to Scotland and founded Freemasonry. Beethoven considered the first part as a possible opera project.

Among his titles were:

- Vermischte Gedichte, 1789
- Die Söhne des Thals, 1803-1804, in two parts
- Die Templer auf Cypern, 1803
  - The Templars in Cyprus English
- Die Kreuzesbrüder, 1804
  - The Brethren of the Cross: a dramatic poem English
- Das Kreuz an der Ostsee, 1806
- Die Brautnacht, 1806
- Martin Luther oder die Weihe der Kraft, 1806
- Der vierundzwanzigste Februar, 1808 (translated into French by Jules Lacroix, Paris, 1849)
- Attila, König der Hunnen, romantische Tragödie, 1809
- Wanda, 1810
- Die Weihe der Unkraft, 1813, a recantation of his earlier work Martin Luther
- Kunigunde die Heilige, 1815
- Geistliche Übungen für drei Tage, 1818
- Die Mutter der Makkabäer, 1820

Zacharias Werner's Theater, a collection (without the author's consent) of Werner's work in 6 volumes, appeared in 1816-1818. Ausgewählte Schriften (Selected writings with a biography by K. J. Schütz) in 15 volumes appeared 1840-1841.
