= Wilhelm Petersen (entomologist) =

Estonian entomologist (1854–1933)

Wilhelm Konstantin Frommhold Petersen (12 June 1854 in Lihula – 3 February 1933 in Tallinn) was an Estonian entomologist, lepidopterist of Baltic-German descent.

He was the first who paid attention to the importance of the characteristics of genitalia in insect taxonomy. He was an early representative of the recognition concept of species.

== Published works ==
- Die Lepidopteren-Fauna des arktischen Gebiets von Europa und die Eiszeit, Mag. Diss., 1881
- Reisebriefe aus Transkaukasien und Armenien, 1884
- Fauna baltica, Band I: Rhopalocera, 1890
- Über indifferente Charaktere als Artmerkmale. Zur Frage der geschlechtlichen Zuchtwahl
- Eesti päevaliblikad. Systematische Bearbeitung der Tagfalter Estlands, 1927
- Lepidopteren-Fauna von Estland, 2 Bände, 1924
- Die Blattminierer-Gattungen Lithocolletis und Nepticula, 2 Bände, 1927-1929
