= Kosmodemyansky =

Kosmodemyansky (Russian: Космодемьянский) is a Russian masculine surname, its feminine counterpart is Kosmodemyanskaya. It may refer to:

- Aleksandr Kosmodemyansky (1925-1945), Soviet military officer
  - 1977 Shura, an asteroid named after Aleksandr Kosmodemyansky
- Lyubov Kosmodemyanskaya (1900–1978), Soviet social worker, mother of Aleksandr and Zoya
  - 2072 Kosmodemyanskaya, an asteroid named after Lyubov Kosmodemyanskaya
- Zoya Kosmodemyanskaya (1923-1941), Soviet partisan, sister of Aleksandr
  - 1793 Zoya, an asteroid named after Zoya Kosmodemyanskaya
