= Reifenstein schools =

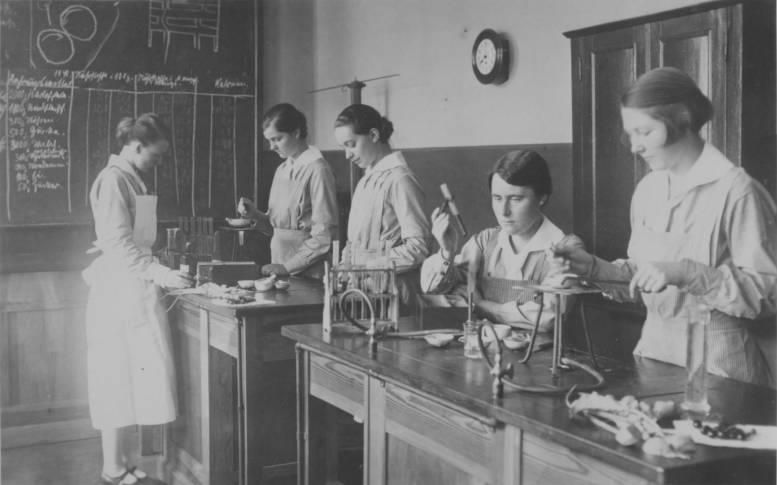
Chemistry education, Maidhof 1926

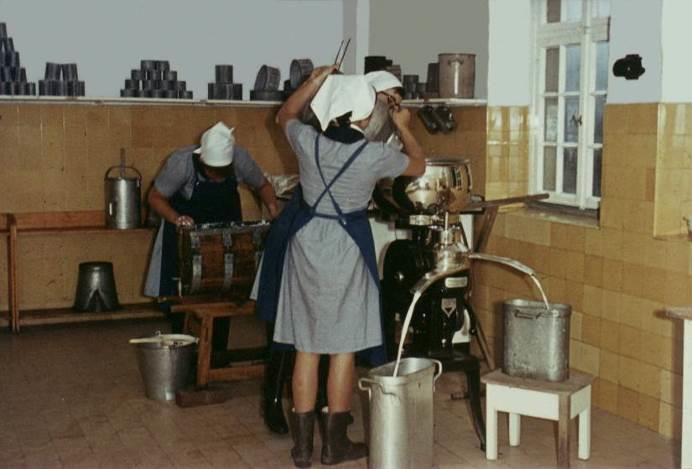
Reifensteiner students 1985 in Wittgenstein dairy

The Reifenstein schools (German: Reifensteiner Schulen) were the various schools of higher education for women associated with the Reifensteiner Verband.

The concept was initiated by Ida von Kortzfleisch, a Prussian noble woman and early German feminist. Reifenstein refers to Reifenstein in Eichsfeld, a municipality in Thuringia and site of the first permanent school. From 1897 to 1990 the Reifensteiner Verband operated about 15 of its own schools and cooperated with further operators. About 40 wirtschaftliche Frauenschulen, rural women's economic schools, were connected to the Reifenstein concept and movement. The association and its journals provided an alumni network and a job placement service, as well as strengthening home economics (Ecotrophology) as an academic discipline and were important for consumer advice and rural social services over all. About 90,000 women took the higher education courses. Some of the alumni, such as Käthe Delius, Marie-Elisabeth Lüders and Freya von Moltke, had important roles in German higher education and German society overall.

== Background ==
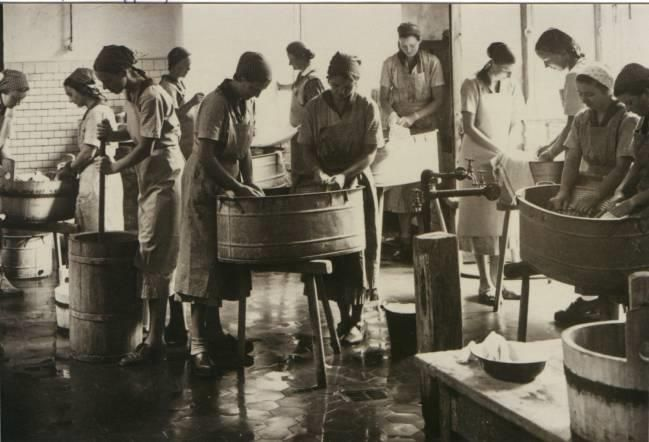
Laundry classes in 1935

Under the German Empire until the early 20th century, household services played a central role in the employment of women. Instead of a systematic training as in the dual system of vocational education, the education of women in the countryside happened often along a principle of on-the-job training. Young men at this time often gained skills from winter schools and various professional educational institutions. Rural women's education was deemed a troubled sector and its shortcomings were a main topic of the early women's movement.

A 1913 doctorate by Joachim Kramer about the household education in Germany refers to the ongoing reform aspects. The 1870s saw some progress; the first winter schools had been founded by the Badische Frauenverein, founded by Princess Louise of Prussia in the state of Baden. While the winter schools lost their impact to permanent schools in Baden already before World War I, they gained importance in Bavaria in the 1920s. Kramer compared the German situation and the state of household education abroad: Switzerland, Belgium and Austria had winter schools; The Austrian education for rural women was comparably backward, and Switzerland took a leading position. In France, housekeeping was a topic in primary schools, but not part of higher education. According to Kramer, Iowa and the state of New York in the United States were then leading in the field.

The technical equipment and technology available to households gained importance in the 19th century. According to Hans Jürgen Teuteberg, the household literature then started to address women. Earlier works, like the Hausväterliteratur (Hlaford books, a German kind of early economic literature) addressed the pater familias, male and noble heads of larger rural households. Within the second half of the 19th century, women - as house mother or housewives - were being perceived and addressed. The new role of the housewife as head of the household was being deemed a positive development first and only later was "how housewives were being made" deemed negative.

== Ida von Kortzfleisch ==
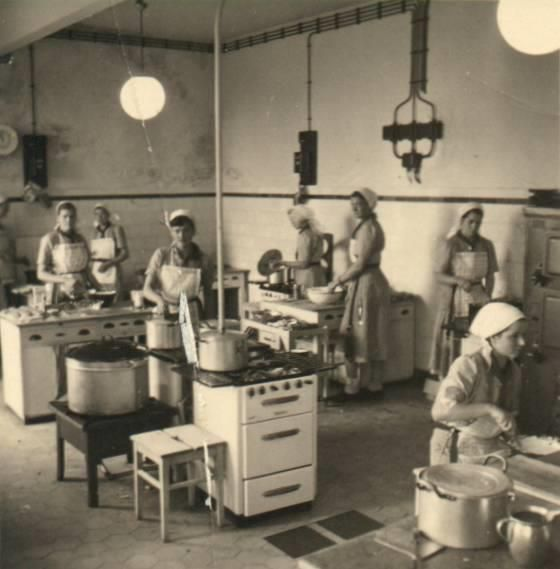
The cooking classes provided the meals for all students. Oberkirchen 1960

In 1894, Ida von Kortzfleisch published an article in Tägliche Rundschau, a Berlin newspaper, called The Female compulsory service in the economist college for women. She responded to a series of articles by the writer Otto Leixner about the "Female Question" in Germany. Leixner had loathed the women's rights movement (as Weiberrechtlerinnen) and he had deplored their alleged lack of patriotism. Kortzfleisch asked to establish a female service year, similar to the Einjährige, a year of military service of male graduates of high schools. Ida von Kortzfleisch explicitly associated her efforts with women's rights as a citizen in the Kaiserreich. The controversy distributed to establish higher education for women in the wirtschaftliche Frauenschule.

== Development ==
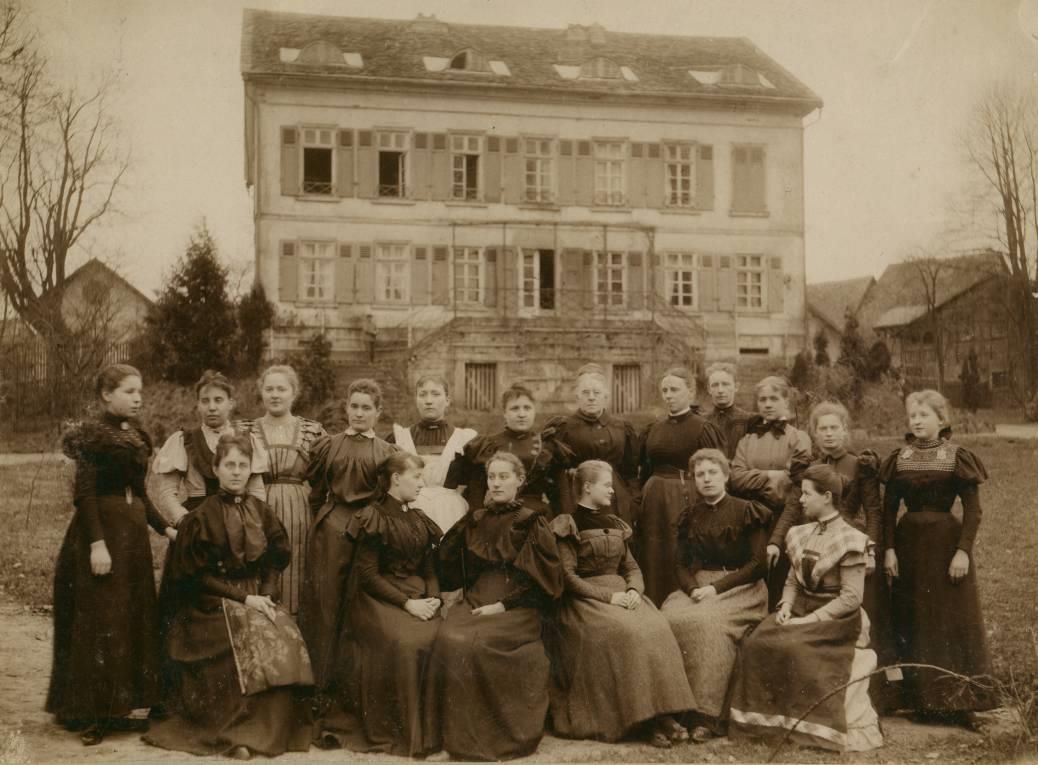
Reifensteiner Schule Nieder-Ofleiden, the first class of 1898 in their Sunday dresses

The first classes started in Ofleiden, but was transferred to Reifenstein soon after. The states of Prussia provided an official acknowledgement in 1909. In 1913, the Reifenstein association was admitted to the Bund Deutscher Frauenvereine. The conservative and basically-Protestant background did not hinder a cooperation with the Jüdische Frauenbund (Jewish Women's Association), which established a Jewish Reifenstein school in Wolfratshausen in 1926.

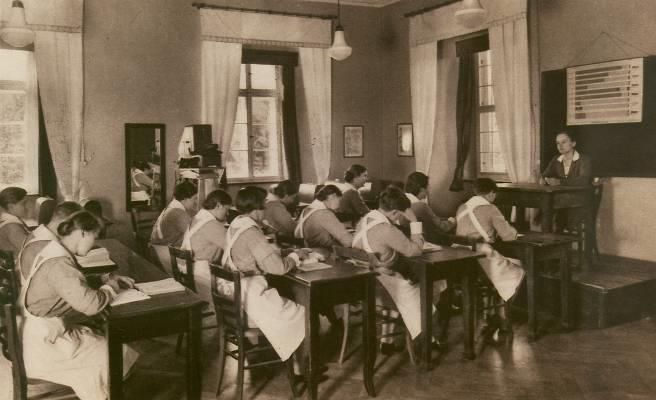
Beinrode in the 1930s

The Reifenstein association and its schools was included in the Reichsnährstand in 1934. The noble background of various pupils and the close connection to the Protestant church lead to some clashes with the regime.

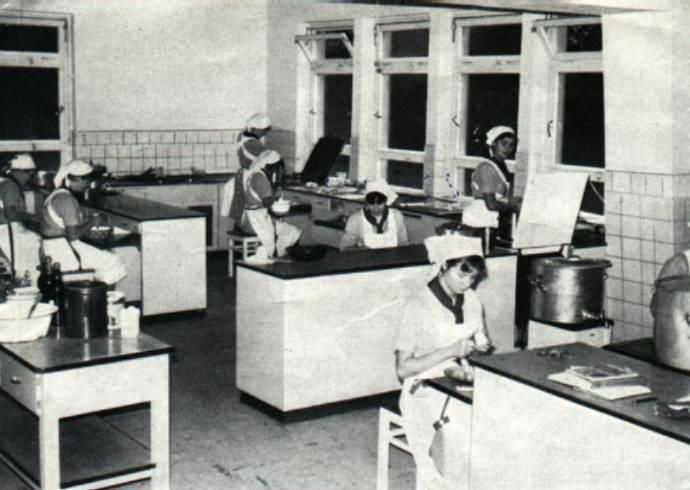
Chattenbühl in the 1960s

Bad Weilbach, Chattenbühl, Obernkirchen, Wittgenstein and Wöltingerode reopened 1946 in the western occupation zones. The eastern parts went into state ownership in 1947. Some of the schools in the far Eastern part of Prussia, e.g. the Landfrauenschule Metgethen had been destroyed during the end of war. The 1960s saw major changes in the concept, e.g. the end of the compulsory maiden costume. The first male student was admitted in 1980. The last two schools closed down in the 1990s and are now part of a Protestant youth organization.

== Trivia ==
Marie-Elisabeth Lüders reported about mocking remarks from Berlin friends about the rural sites and backgrounds of the schools. Carry Brachvogel provided material for improved household knowledge in Bavaria. She deplored the lack of quality cuisine in the Free State of Bavaria and expected some improvements via the training courses provided by teachers trained in Reifenstein schools. The Bayerische Kochbuch (Bavarian Cookbook), a still-famous household item, is not about specific Bavarian menus, but is based on the experience of the school in Miesbach.

== Famous pupils ==
- Elisabeth von Barsewisch and Gisa von Barsewisch, authors
- Caroline Hermine and Henriette, daughters of German Emperor Wilhelm II, in Obernkirchen
- Käthe Delius, (1893–1977), longtime head of Bundesforschungsanstalt für Hauswirtschaft, the federal research institute for household economics
- Friederike Luise von Hannover, later Queen of Greece, 1937 in Obernkirchen
- Marie-Elisabeth Lüders 1899 in Nieder-Ofleiden, German feminist and politician
- Freya von Moltke, member of the 20 July movement
- Ruth von Kalkreuth, pioneer of the Landfrauenmovement in Württemberg
- Elisabeth von Thadden, educator and member of the 20 July resistance movement
- Ernestine von Trott zu Solz, social work activist
- Verena Lafferentz, granddaughter of Richard Wagner, Obernkirchen 1936/37

== List of schools ==
The table contains schools owned by the Reifensteiner Verband. A further 25 schools have been associated with the Reifenstein concept, among them a school in Stift Finn in Estonia (1922–1939) and Lehrfarm (training farm) Brakwater, near Windhuk in the then German colony of Südwestafrika (Namibia). The name of Maid (older German for Miss or maiden) refers to the acronym Mut, Ausdauer, Idealismus und Demut (Courage, perseverance, idealism and humility). While the symbols worne by the Maiden are valuable collector's items, some tried to relate them with the Arbeitsmaiden of the Nazi Reichsarbeitsdienst, which are however not connected in any way.

Picture	Description	Symbol
Reifensteiner Schule Ofleiden	Nieder-Ofleiden, Homberg-upon-Ohm 1897-1900	
Reifensteiner Schule Reifenstein	Reifenstein, Eichsfeld in Thuringia 1900-1949	Schulnadel Reifensteiner Reifenstein
Reifensteiner Schule Obernkirchen	Obernkirchen 1901-1971	
Reifensteiner Schule Maidburg	Maidburg in the Province of Posen 1904-1919	
Reifensteiner Schule Scherpingen	Scherpingen in West Prussia 1908-1928	
Reifensteiner Schule Weilbach	Bad Weilbach 1911-1972	
Reifensteiner Schule Metgethen	Kronprinzessin-Cecilien-Schule Metgethen in Eastern Prussia 1912-1944	Schulnadel Metgethen
Reifensteiner Schule Oberzwehren	Oberzwehren near Kassel 1917-1944	
Reifensteiner Schule Chattenbühl	Chattenbühl (Kattenbühl) near Hannoversch Münden 1918-1964	
Wöltingerode 2001	Wöltingerode near Goslar 1918-1990	
Reifensteiner Schule Maidhof	Maidhof in Gnadenfrei, Silesia 1919-1945	
Reifensteiner Schule Beinrode 1930	Beinrode near Leinefeld in Thuringia 1920-1949	
Gartenanlagen in Wittgenstein 1985	Wittgenstein in Sauerland 1928-1990	'Wittgensteiner' Schulnadel
Schertlinhaus 1944	Schertlinhaus in Burtenbach 1939-1945	
