= Metgethen massacre =

1945 Soviet killing of German civilians

Coordinates: 54°43′34″N 20°22′07″E

- Part of Eastern Front (World War II)
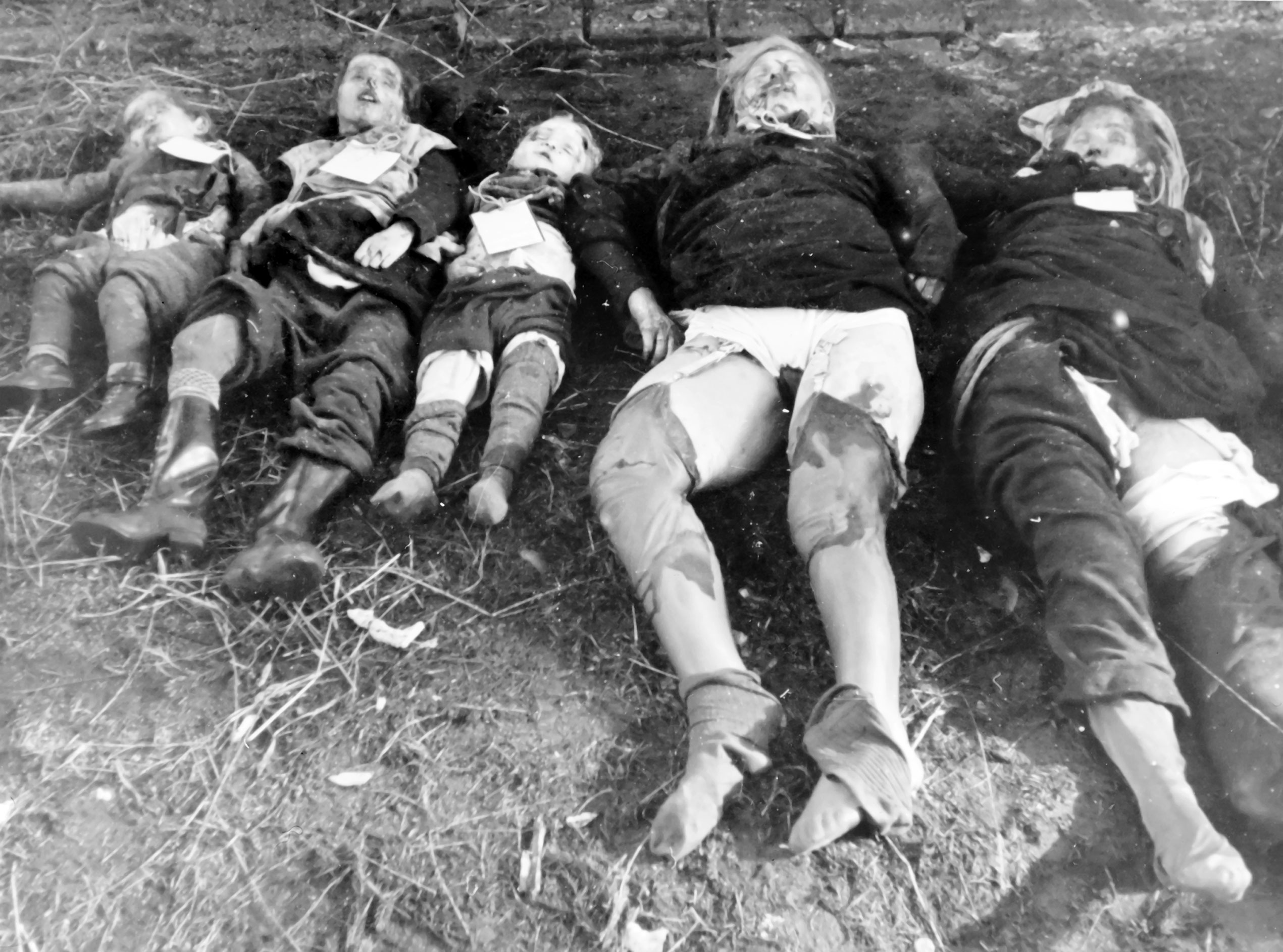
- The German photo with the original caption "Nahaufnahme von den beiden Frauen und den drei Kindern" (closeup of the two women and the three children). Image courtesy of the Library of Congress
- Location: Metgethen, Königsberg, East Prussia
- Date: Around January-February in 1945
- Target: Mostly Germans consisting of women and children
- Attack type: Mass murder by shooting and rape
- Deaths: 32
- Perpetrator: Red Army
- Motive: Aftermath of Battle of Königsberg

The Metgethen massacre (German: Massaker von Metgethen) was a massacre of German civilians by the Red Army in the Königsberg, East Prussia, suburb Metgethen, which is now Imeni Alexandra Kosmodemyanskogo in Russia's Kaliningrad Oblast, circa January–February 1945.

== Timeline ==
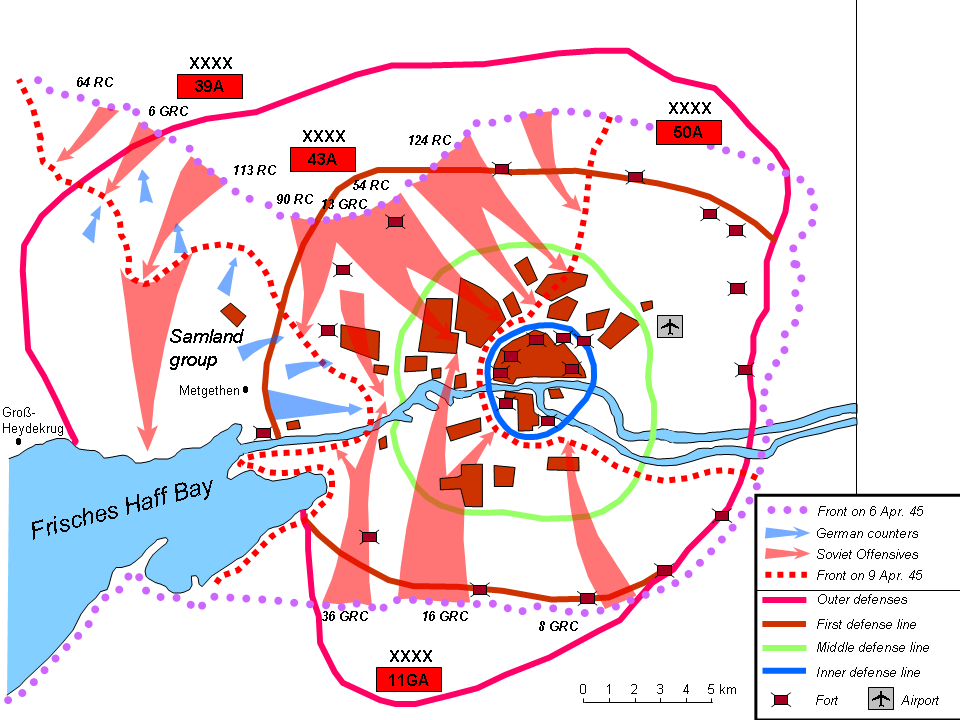
Location of Metgethen, showing the Königsberg defenses and the Soviet attack of 6–9 April 1945.

During the Battle of Königsberg in 1945, Soviet forces attacking from the north of the Samland peninsula, reached the Vistula Lagoon to the west of Königsberg on January 30, taking Metgethen in the process, a village with a railway station. After dark, they further advanced westward to Groß-Heydekrug. German forces recaptured Metgethen on 19 February in a successful bid to reopen the vital road and railway line between Königsberg and the Baltic Sea harbour of Pillau. According to German reports, mutilated corpses of civilians were discovered.

== German findings ==
According to Alfred-Maurice de Zayas, there are several contemporary reports by German military personnel stating that, among other things, women had been raped, mutilated, and killed, and that 32 civilians had been rounded up on the local tennis court and killed by an explosion. In one of the eyewitness reports, Captain Hermann Sommer, former staff officer of the fortress commander of Königsberg Otto Lasch, stated:

I made my own observations on February 27th, 1945, when I came to Metgethen on official business. When I drove my motorcycle, just before the railway-crossing, into a gravel-pit, in order to inspect the building there for its usability, I found, behind it, the corpses of twelve women and six children. All were completely undressed and huddled up in a pile. Most of the children had had their skulls broken with a blunt object or their tiny bodies perforated with innumerable bayonet stabs. The women, mostly older ones between forty and sixty years, had also been killed with knives or bayonets. On all of them, black-and-blue marks of beating were clearly visible.

The Library of Congress possesses an album of 26 mounted photographs, with the cover title Bildbericht über von den Bolschewisten ermordete und geschändete Deutsche in Metgethen ('Picture report about the Germans murdered and desecrated by Bolshevists at Metgethen'). According to an ink stamp on its cover, this album had once been filed in the office of the commander of the Sicherheitspolizei at Königsberg.

== See also ==
- Nemmersdorf massacre
- Gegenmiao massacre
- Red Army atrocities
