= Aleksandr Kosmodemyansky =

Soviet military officer and Hero of the Soviet Union

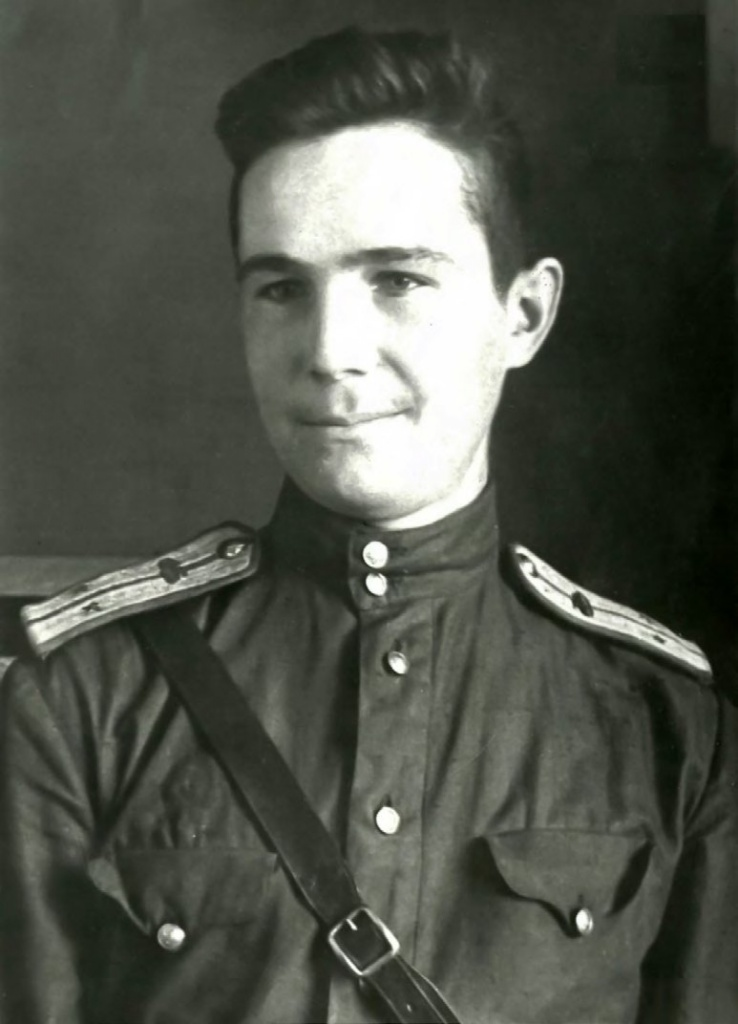
- Kosmodemyansky in c. 1940s
- Born: Aleksandr Anatolyevich Kosmodemyansky; 27 July 1925; Osino-Gay, near of Tambov, Soviet Union
- Died: 13 April 1945 (aged 19); The Kaporner Heath near Metgethen, East Prussia, Nazi Germany
- Burial place: Novodevichy Cemetery
- Relatives: Zoya Kosmodemyanskaya (sister)
- Military career
- Allegiance: Soviet Union
- Branch: Red Army
- Service years: 1942–1945
- Rank: Senior lieutenant
- Units: 42nd Guards Heavy Tank Brigade; 350th Guards Heavy Self-Propelled Artillery Regiment
- Conflicts: World War II; East Prussian offensive; Battle of Königsberg
- Awards: Hero of the Soviet Union; Order of Lenin; Order of the Patriotic War (2)

Aleksandr Anatolyevich Kosmodemyansky (Russian: Алекса́ндр Анато́льевич Космодемья́нский; 27 July 1925 – 13 April 1945) was a Soviet military officer and Hero of the Soviet Union, who was bestowed this title posthumously after having been killed in World War II during the capture of the settlement of Vierbrüderkrug, in the Kaporner Heath near Metgethen, just west of Königsberg, East Prussia, Nazi Germany. He was the brother of Zoya Kosmodemyanskaya.

== Legacy ==
The settlement of imeni Alexandra Kosmodemyanskogo in Kaliningrad Oblast was renamed after him in 1956. The minor planet 1977 Shura was named in his honour, while 1793 Zoya and 2072 Kosmodemyanskaya were named for his sister and for his mother, Lyubov Kosmodemyanskaya, respectively.

== Gallery ==
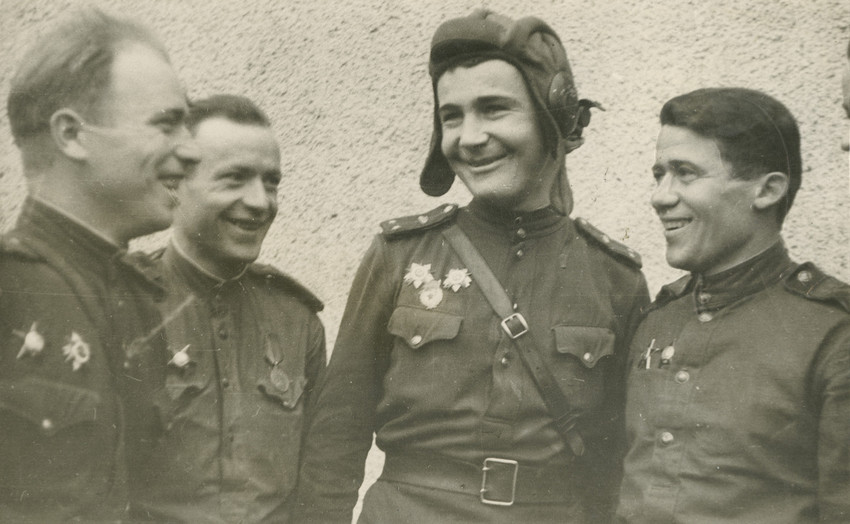
Kosmodemyansky (second from right) with comrades in East Prussia, 4 January 1945.

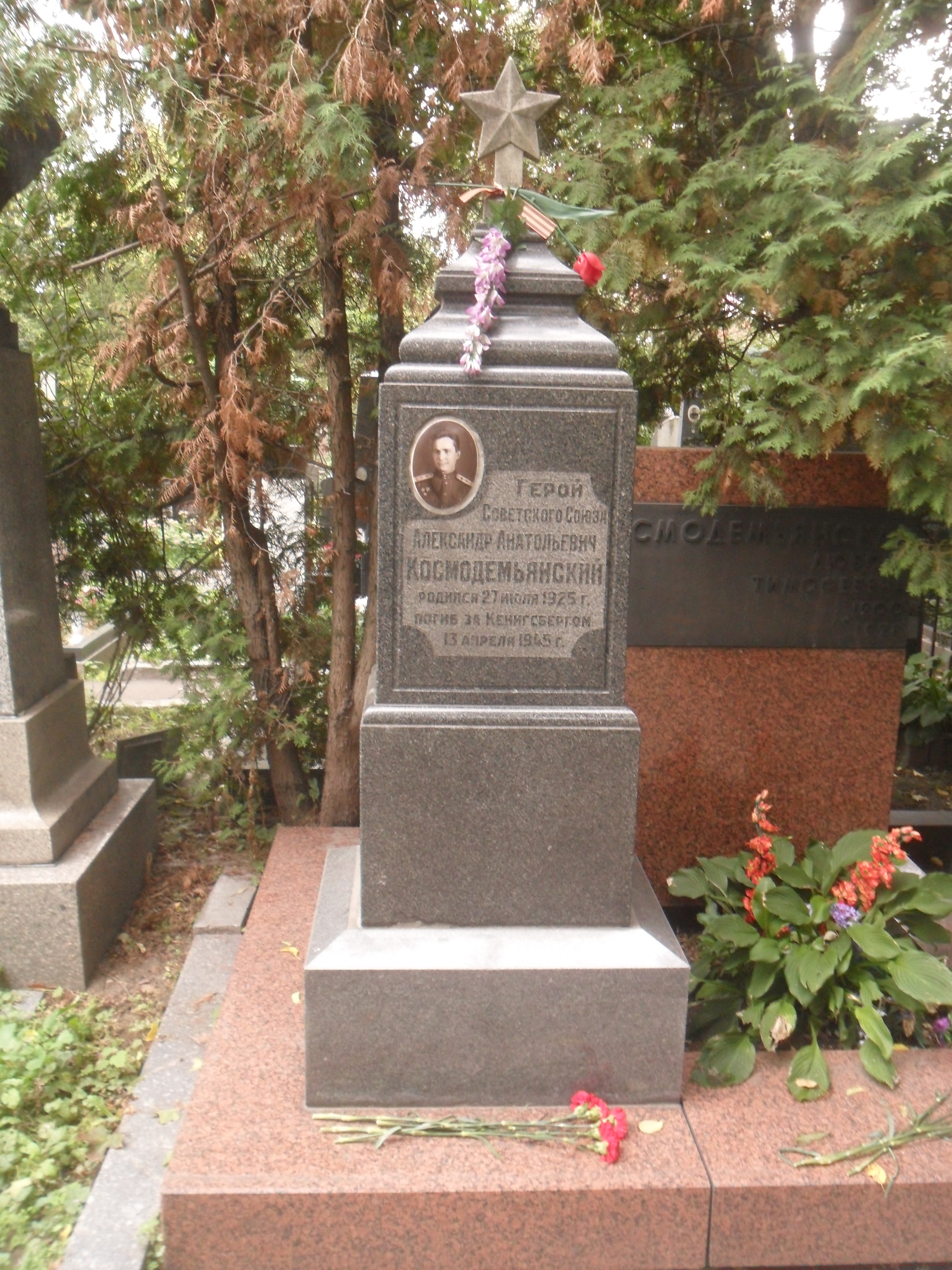
Tombstone at Moscow's Novodevichy Cemetery

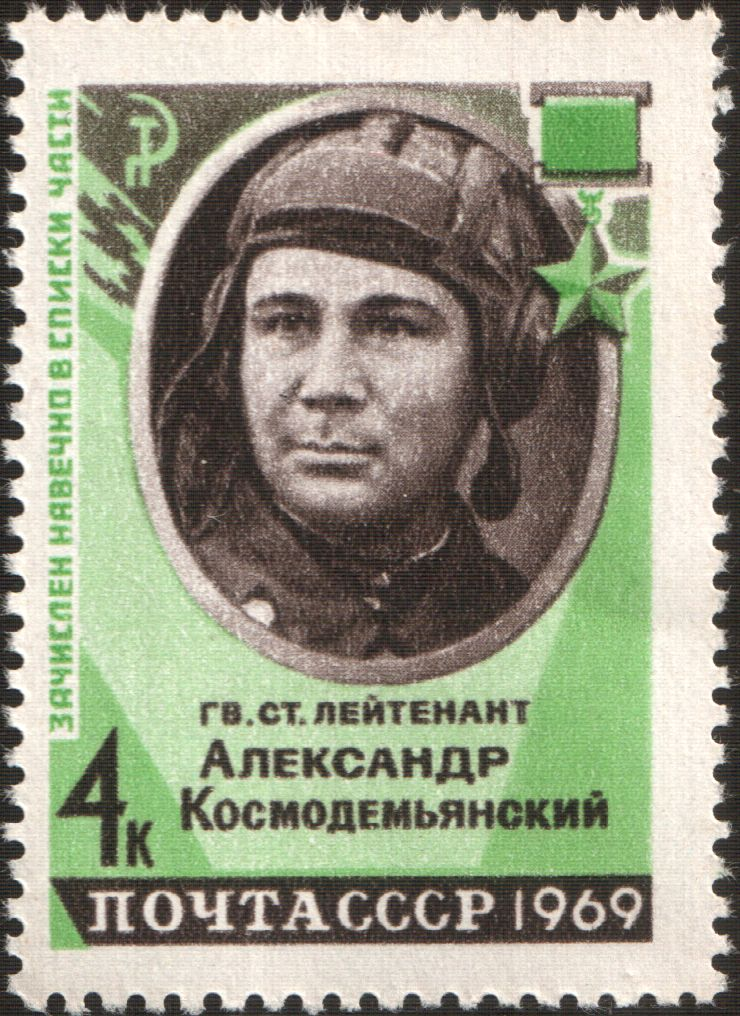
1969 CPA stamp
