= 1977 Shura =

Stony main-belt asteroid

Discovery
- Discovered by: T. Smirnova
- Discovery site: Crimean Astrophysical Obs.
- Discovery date: 30 August 1970

Designations
- Named after: Aleksandr Kosmodemyansky (Hero of the Soviet Union)
- Alternative designations: 1970 QY · 1942 RW; 1952 UT_{1} · 1968 DE
- Minor planet category: main-belt · (middle)

Orbital characteristics
- Epoch 4 September 2017 (JD 2458000.5)
- Uncertainty parameter 0
- Observation arc: 62.80 yr (22,936 days)
- Aphelion: 2.9845 AU
- Perihelion: 2.5782 AU
- Semi-major axis: 2.7814 AU
- Eccentricity: 0.0730
- Orbital period (sidereal): 4.64 yr (1,694 days)
- Mean anomaly: 120.99°
- Mean motion: 0° 12^{m} 45^{s} / day
- Inclination: 7.7643°
- Longitude of ascending node: 332.26°
- Argument of perihelion: 310.44°

Physical characteristics
- Dimensions: 14.89 km (calculated); 16.27±0.65 km 17.211±0.117; 18.497±0.124 km
- Synodic rotation period: 7.461±0.004 h
- Geometric albedo: 0.1311±0.0069; 0.150±0.028; 0.185±0.016; 0.20 (assumed)
- Spectral type: SMASS = Sq; C · S
- Absolute magnitude (H): 11.40 · 11.5 · 11.64±0.30

1977 Shura, provisional designation 1970 QY, is a stony asteroid from the middle region of the asteroid belt, approximately 16 kilometers in diameter. It was discovered on 30 August 1970, by Russian astronomer Tamara Smirnova at the Crimean Astrophysical Observatory, Nauchnyj, on the Crimean peninsula. The asteroid was named for Soviet Aleksandr Kosmodemyansky.

== Orbit and classification ==
Shura orbits the Sun in the central main-belt at a distance of 2.6–3.0 AU once every 4 years and 8 months (1,694 days). Its orbit has an eccentricity of 0.07 and an inclination of 8° with respect to the ecliptic.

The asteroid was first observed as 1942 RW at Turku Observatory in 1942. The first used observation was a precovery taken at Goethe Link Observatory in 1954, extending the body's observation arc by 16 years prior to its official discovery observation at Nauchnyj.

== Physical characteristics ==
=== Rotation period ===
A rotational lightcurve was obtained from photometric measurements made at the Australian Oakley Southern Sky Observatory in March 2010. It gave a well-defined rotation period of 7.461±0.004 hours with a brightness amplitude of 0.34 in magnitude (U=3).

=== Diameter and albedo ===
According to the space-based surveys carried out by the Japanese Akari satellite and the NEOWISE mission of NASA's Wide-field Infrared Survey Explorer, the asteroid measures 16.3 and 18.5 kilometers in diameter, respectively, and its surface has a corresponding albedo of 0.19 and 0.13. The Collaborative Asteroid Lightcurve Link (CALL) assumes a standard albedo for stony asteroids of 0.20 and calculates a diameter of 14.9 kilometers.

Between 2005 and 2022, 1977 Shura has been observed to occult three stars.

=== Spectral type ===
CALL characterizes Shura as a stony S-type asteroid. In the SMASS taxonomic scheme, it is classified as a transitional Sq-subtype to the elusive Q-type asteroids of the main-belt. Shura is also characterized as a carbonaceous C-type asteroid by Pan-STARRS' photometric survey.

== Naming ==
This minor planet was named after Aleksandr Kosmodemyansky (1925–1945), Hero of the Soviet Union, who died at the age of 19 during the German-Soviet War, shortly after the Battle of Königsberg. "Shura" is a pet name for Aleksandr. The minor planets 1793 Zoya and 2072 Kosmodemyanskaya were named in honor of his sister and mother, respectively. The official naming citation was published by the Minor Planet Center on 30 June 1977 (M.P.C. 4190).
