= Sergei Strunnikov =

Soviet photographer (1907–1944)

- Сергей Струнников
- Born: September 25, 1907; Kherson, Russian Empire
- Died: June 22, 1944 (aged 36); Poltava Air Base, Ukrainian SSR, Soviet Union
- Education: State Film College
- Occupation: Photograph

Sergei Nikolayevich Strunnikov (Russian: Сергей Николаевич Струнников; September 25, 1907, Kherson – June 22, 1944, Poltava) was a Soviet photographer, master of reportage and photo portraiture. He was the author of the photograph of Zoya Kosmodemyanskaya's body, shots of the Battle of Moscow, life in besieged Leningrad, the Battle of Stalingrad, and other historical photographs.

== Biography ==
He was born in 1907 in Kherson to the artist Nikolai Strunnikov, in 1922 the family moved to Moscow. After finishing school, he worked as a poster hanger at the Palas movie theater, studied at the cameraman department of the State Film College, and worked as a lighting technician at the Mezhrabpomfilm studio. His first photographs appeared in print in 1928. While studying at the film college, he shot the short documentary film Fuel Exploration (1929), dedicated to the work of a geological exploration party, and took a number of photographs for the magazines Flame, Soviet Screen, and Rost

In 1930, after graduating from the college, he worked as an assistant cameraman at the Mezhrabpomfilm studio in the film crew of Vsevolod Pudovkin, who believed that "Comrade Strunnikov should become a good film worker".

In the early 1930s, he served in the Red Army, collaborated with the Red Army newspaper "Na boyevom postu", and won first prize in one of the military photo competitions. He took part in the competition for the best photo essay in the magazine Sovetskoe Foto. In 1933, as a photojournalist for the Chief Directorate of the Northern Sea Route, he took part in the polar expedition of the icebreaker Krasin along the Northern Sea Route.

He shot reports on construction sites of the Five-Year Plan in Central Asia and South Caucasus. He collaborated with the newspapers "Vodny Transport", Komsomolskaya Pravda, Izvestia. In 1940, Strunnikov's personal exhibition was held in the Central House of Journalists, timed to coincide with the 10th anniversary of his work as a photojournalist.

=== World War II ===
In August 1941, Strunnikov was invited as a photojournalist to the Pravda newspaper, and became a war photojournalist in October.

He photographed the Battle of Moscow, worked in the German rear, and on the front lines. The photographs were published in Pravda. In 1942, 57 of Strunnikov's works were presented at the exhibition Military Moscow in the Central House of Officers of the Russian Army, and his photographs were included in the album "Moscow, November 1941". That same year, the photographer was nominated for the medal Medal "For Battle Merit".

He sought to capture the besieged Leningrad, and at the end of 1942 he was sent to the city to work on the publication "Leningrad in Struggle". He visited Leningrad again at the beginning of 1944.

He worked on the Western, Bryansk, Leningrad, Volkhov, Northwestern, 1st Baltic fronts, filmed in Stalingrad, Tula, Kalinin, Smolensk, Kharkiv, Odesa, Crimea, Sevastopol and other places of military action. He kept war diaries.

He died with the rank of senior lieutenant during Operation Frantic during a bombing raid on the Poltava Air Base, together with his comrades in arms, shooting down a German bomber with an anti-aircraft gun, which fell and exploded nearby. He was buried in Petrovsky Park in Poltava; instead of an obelisk, Allied pilots installed a propeller blade from the Boeing B-17 Flying Fortress on his grave as a symbol of the journalists' deaths at their combat post. Later, the ashes were transferred to Slavy Square, and a memorial plaque was installed on the grave.

== Themes and style ==
Strunnikov's photographs are characterized by a wide genre and thematic range: in the late 1920s - 1930s, the subjects of his photographs were production moments of the Mezhrabpomfilm studio, the work of geological expeditions, landscapes and people of the Arctic, construction projects of the five-year plan in Central Asia and South Caucasus, industrial landscapes and the faces of construction participants; he made portraits of the pilot Valery Chkalov before his flight to the USA, pianists Yakov Flier and Emil Gilels, test pilot Vladimir Kokkinaki and writer Aleksey Novikov-Priboy.

During the war, he took photographs of scenes from the defense of Moscow, life during the siege of Leningrad, the Battle of Stalingrad, and pictures on various fronts of military operations.

=== Creative manner ===
Striving for artistic expressiveness in a photograph, Strunnikov did not consider it possible to achieve it at the expense of authenticity, treating photography as a document, and did not resort to staged shots.

Working in wartime Moscow, Strunnikov tried to take pictures unnoticed, which is why he was often mistaken for a spy and taken to the militsiya.

Strunnikov sought to capture situations of the highest intensity of military operations and the tension of human strength, he photographed bombings while flying on a bomber, and he took a number of pictures under fire on the battlefield. According to contemporaries, the photographer disregarded danger while working, defining the motto of his work as "What is considered difficult cannot be called impossible". According to Strunnikov’s own formulation, his creative credo was to "move away from the standard and take the very salt of life, the sharpest, the most necessary".

== Memory ==
Sergei Strunnikov's archive contains over 30,000 photographs. The photographer's works are in the Central Archive of Socio-Political History of Moscow, the Federal Archival Agency, and the State Literary Museum.

In 2005, the photographer's photographs of Leningrad during the siege and his diary entries were published in the bilingual publication "Report from Blockade Leningrad: Photographs by War Correspondent Sergei Strunnikov".

In 2011, the artist's photographic legacy was presented at a posthumous solo exhibition "War Photographs of Sergei Strunnikov" at the State Literary Museum.

In 2020, on the 76th anniversary of the lifting of the siege of Leningrad, Strunnikov's blockade photographs were published by Glavarkhiv in the library of the Moscow Electronic School.

Sergei Strunnikov’s name is engraved on a memorial plaque in the editorial office of Pravda among the newspaper’s journalists who died during the war.
