= Ida von Kortzfleisch =

German educator

Ida von Kortzfleisch (1850 – 1915), was a German educator. She is known as the founder of the Reifensteiner Schulen, a chain of household schools for women which became very popular and influential from 1896 onward.
