= Landfrauenschule Metgethen =

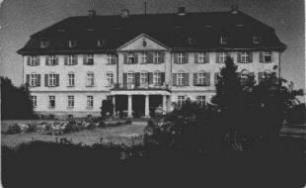

Information
- Former name: Crown Princess Cecilie School; German: Kronprinzessin-Cäcilie-Schule
- Established: 1912
- Founder: Elisabeth Böhm-Lamgarben
- Closed: 1945
- Gender: Women

Landfrauenschule Metgethen was a German women's school in Metgethen, which became part of Königsberg in 1939.

== History ==
Symbol of the Metgethen school

Founded by Elisabeth Böhm-Lamgarben, chairwoman of the Landwirtschaftlicher Hausfrauenverein Ostpreußen (agricultural housewives' association of East Prussia), the women's school opened in April 1912 and served the province of East Prussia. Its original name was the Kronprinzessin-Cäcilie-Schule; its namesake, Duchess Cecilie of Mecklenburg-Schwerin, visited the school in 1913. Its directors included Irene Freiin von Gayl until 1919 and Marie Goetz from 1926 to 1945. Although the school closed in 1945 amidst World War II, the structure survived the war and is now in Kaliningrad, Russia. The school had been associated with the Reifenstein schools.
