= Imeni Alexandra Kosmodemyanskogo =

Suburb of the formerly German city of Kaliningrad, Russia

Coordinates: 54°43′35″N 20°21′30″E

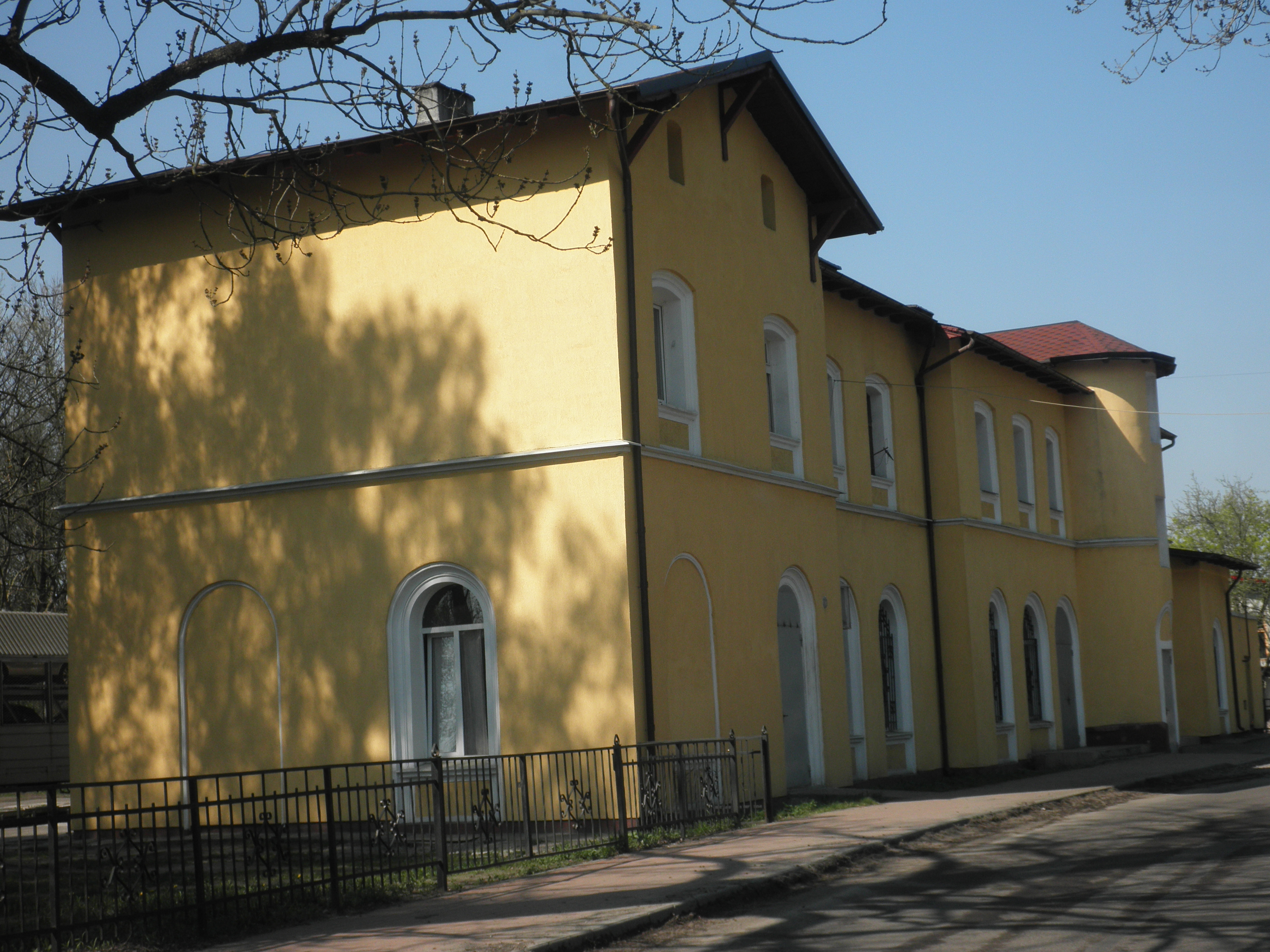
Local railway station

Imeni Alexandra Kosmodemyanskogo (Russian: и́мени Алекса́ндра Космодемья́нского) is a residential area in Tsentralny Administrative District of the city of Kaliningrad in Kaliningrad Oblast, Russia. It was formerly known by its German-language name Metgethen as first a suburb of and then a quarter of Königsberg, located west of the city center.

== History ==
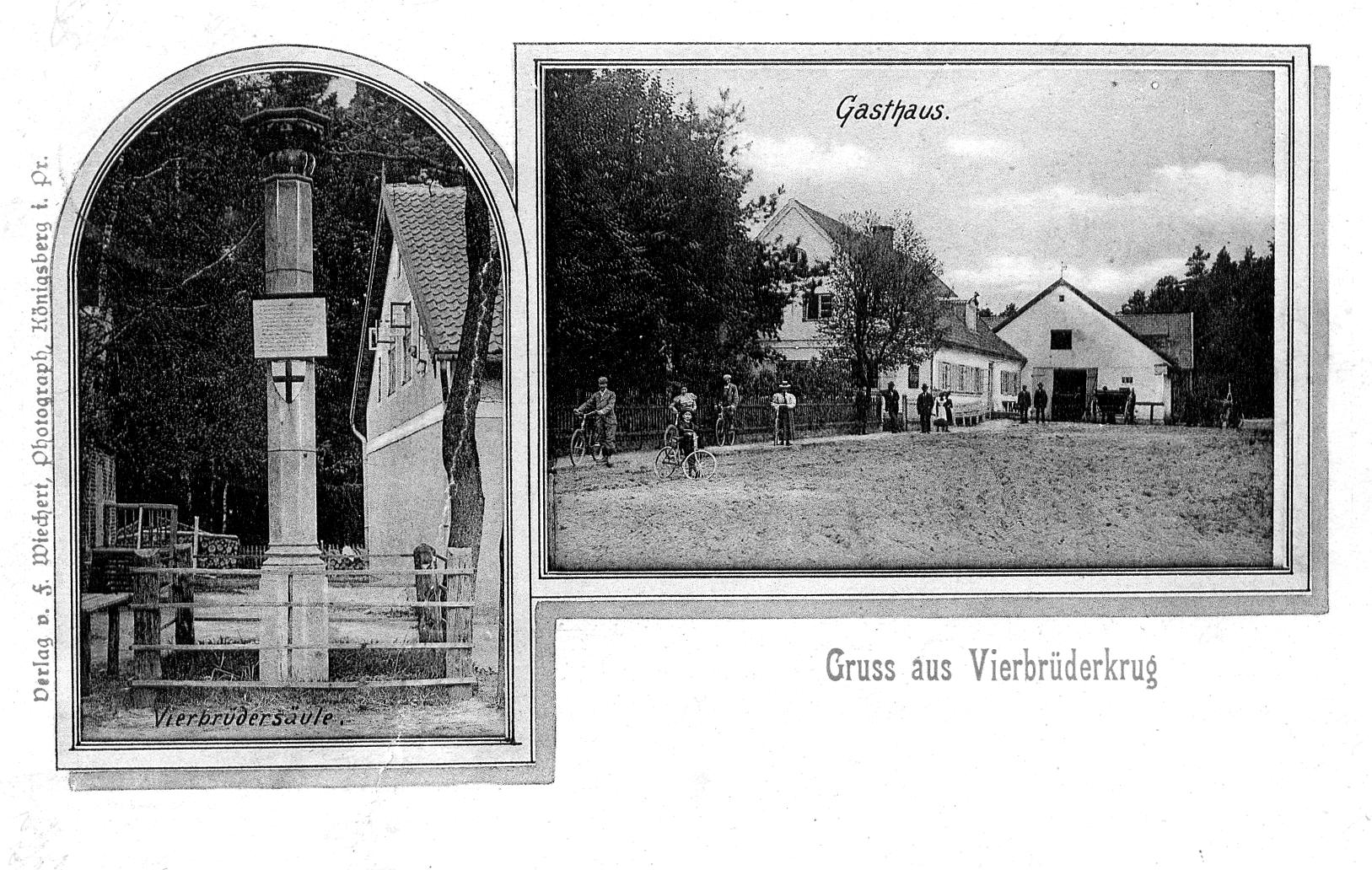
Vierbrüderkrug inn and the Vierbrüdersäule memorial

Located in the Kaporner Heath north of the Vistula Lagoon, the village of Metgethen was first mentioned in Teutonic chronicles in 1278 as Myntigeite. At the time, Landmeister Konrad von Thierberg granted part of the farmland to an Old Prussian named Regune. The name "Metgethen" was carried by the estate's owners until 1482, when the last of that name married his daughter to Christoph von Röder, a commander from the Thirteen Years' War and ancestor of Erhard Ernst von Röder. Its manor was constructed ca. 1760 by an Italian architect.

Metgethen developed into a villa suburb ca. 1900 and was popular for day trips, especially its Vierbrüderkrug inn and the Vierbrüdersäule memorial honoring the legend of four half-brothers of the Teutonic Knights slain by Sudovians in the 13th century. The suburb contained the Landfrauenschule Metgethen, a school for East Prussian women, as well as the fire academy and a Volkssportschule to train physical education teachers. A church for the village was sponsored by the merchant Gustav Bruhn and built by Edmund May in 1924-1925. Metgethen was incorporated into the city of Königsberg in 1939; to the east of Metgethen was the quarter Moditten.

During World War II, the architect Alfred Fiedler of Tilsit, an ally of Erich Koch, constructed a cement factory in Metgethen which used Ukrainian forced labor to make anti-air defense. In 1940–1943, the Germans also operated a forced labor camp for Jewish men in the district. In 1945, during the Battle of Königsberg, a German counter-attack recaptured Metgethen from the Red Army. German military personnel reported evidence of a massacre of civilians carried out by the Red Army during the three weeks the village was under Soviet occupation.

In 1946, after the district became part of the Soviet Union, it was renamed Lesnoye. In 1956, it was given its current name in honor of Aleksandr Kosmodemyansky, a Soviet war hero who was killed in a battle northwest of Königsberg in 1945. In later years, it lost its status of a stand-alone inhabited locality and was incorporated into Kaliningrad as one of its residential areas.

== Famous people ==
- Erhard Ernst von Röder, Prussian field marshal and minister, lord of the manor (Gutsherr) of Metgethen
- Sibylle von Olfers, children's author, born at Metgethen Manor
