= 2072 Kosmodemyanskaya =

Main-belt asteroid

Discovery
- Discovered by: T. Smirnova
- Discovery site: Crimean Astrophysical Obs.
- Discovery date: 31 August 1973

Designations
- Named after: L. Kosmodemyanskaya (mother of Zoya and Aleksandr)
- Alternative designations: 1973 QE_{2} · 1944 BD; 1958 XY · 1962 XL_{1} 1975 EL
- Minor planet category: main-belt · (inner)

Orbital characteristics
- Epoch 4 September 2017 (JD 2458000.5)
- Uncertainty parameter 0
- Observation arc: 61.13 yr (22,326 days)
- Aphelion: 2.8512 AU
- Perihelion: 2.0508 AU
- Semi-major axis: 2.4510 AU
- Eccentricity: 0.1633
- Orbital period (sidereal): 3.84 yr (1,402 days)
- Mean anomaly: 113.25°
- Mean motion: 0° 15^{m} 24.84^{s} / day
- Inclination: 4.7419°
- Longitude of ascending node: 26.200°
- Argument of perihelion: 38.426°

Physical characteristics
- Dimensions: 4.843±0.215 km 8.93 km (calculated)
- Synodic rotation period: 4.4 h 10±1 h
- Geometric albedo: 0.20 (assumed); 0.522±0.098; 0.6805±0.1904
- Spectral type: S
- Absolute magnitude (H): 12.61 · 13.03±0.28

2072 Kosmodemyanskaya, provisional designation 1973 QE_{2}, is a stony asteroid from the inner regions of the asteroid belt, approximately 6 kilometers in diameter.

The asteroid was discovered on 31 August 1973, by Russian astronomer Tamara Smirnova at Crimean Astrophysical Observatory, Nauchnyj, on the Crimean peninsula. It was named after Lyubov Kosmodemyanskaya, mother of Soviet heroes Zoya and Aleksandr.

== Classification and orbit ==
Kosmodemyanskaya orbits the Sun in the inner main-belt at a distance of 2.1–2.9 AU once every 3 years and 10 months (1,402 days). Its orbit has an eccentricity of 0.16 and an inclination of 5° with respect to the ecliptic.

The asteroid was first identified as 1944 BD at Turku Observatory in 1944. Its first used observation is a precovery taken at Palomar Observatory in 1956, extending the body's observation arc by 17 years prior to the official discovery observation at Nauchnyj.

== Physical characteristics ==
Kosmodemyanskaya has been characterized as a stony S-type asteroid.

=== Lightcurves ===
The first rotational lightcurve was obtained by American astronomer Richard P. Binzel during a photometric survey of small main-belt asteroids in the 1980s. It showed a rotation period of 4.4 hours with a brightness variation of 0.09 magnitude (U=2). In November 2004, another lightcurve of Kosmodemyanskaya was obtained by French amateur astronomer Laurent Bernasconi. Lightcurve analysis gave a period of 10 hours with an amplitude of 0.05 magnitude (U=2-).

=== Diameter and albedo ===
According to the survey carried out by NASA's Wide-field Infrared Survey Explorer with its subsequent NEOWISE mission, Kosmodemyanskaya measures 4.843 kilometers in diameter and its surface has an exceptionally high albedo of 0.522, while the Collaborative Asteroid Lightcurve Link assumes a standard albedo for stony asteroids of 0.20 and calculates a diameter of 8.93 kilometers with an absolute magnitude of 12.61.

== Naming ==
This minor planet was named in memory of social worker Lyubov Kosmodemyanskaya (1900–1978), mother of Soviet heroes Zoya Kosmodemyanskaya and Aleksandr Kosmodemyansky. The minor planets 1793 Zoya and 1977 Shura, pet name for Aleksandr, were named after the two. The official naming citation was published by the Minor Planet Center on 1 April 1980 (M.P.C. 5282).
