= Marie-Elisabeth Lüders =

German politician (1878–1966)

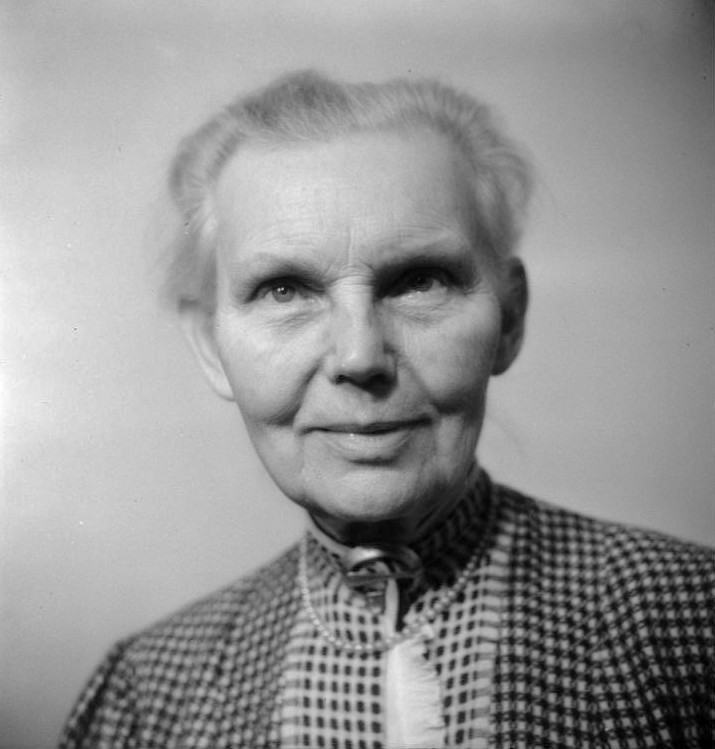
Marie Elisabeth Lüders (1949)

Marie-Elisabeth Lüders (June 25, 1878 – March 23, 1966) was a German politician and women's rights activist.

Lüders was born in Berlin as the descendant of the 18th century agricultural reformer Philipp Ernst Lüders. Her father was a senior Prussian civil servant. After finishing school in Berlin's western district of Charlottenburg, she took singing and photography lessons before enrolling in a one-year course in economics for women at the 'Reifensteiner wirtschaftliche Frauenschulen' in the Hessian town of Nieder-Ofleiden. Later, she became a social worker for the City of Berlin, responsible for inspecting housings with a view to sanitary conditions. She also worked for various women's organisations, mainly in the field of workers' protection and social affairs.

After Prussian universities finally opened their doors to female students in 1908, Lüders was among the first women to enroll at Berlin's Friedrich Wilhelm University (today known as Humboldt University of Berlin). She did so in 1909 and was awarded a doctorate in political science as early as in 1912, as many of her previous studies were credited towards her degree. During her studies, she founded a lobbying group in Berlin to promote equal educational opportunities for women.

In 1917, she obtained a senior position with the newly established 'Frauenarbeitszentrale' (′Women's Central Work Office‵) and the 'Frauenreferat' (‵Women's Department′) of the German War Office. Responsible for staffing, she made sure to recruit as many women as possible – among them many leading activists of the women's movement – to other senior positions within these organizations. Two of her priorities were to improve women's working conditions and to provide childcare for women workers' families.

Like many progressive women's rights activist from the middle classes, Lüders had joined one of Germany's liberal parties. Her choice had fallen upon the social liberal German Democratic Party (DDP). In 1919, she stood for the first free general elections of the Weimar Republic. She narrowly missed a seat to the National Assembly but succeeded Friedrich Naumann after his death in late 1919. She was a member of the Reichstag in 1920–21 and 1924–30), laying a strong focus on women's, workers', and children's rights. In 1930, she declined requests to stand as a candidate again, as she did not agree to her party's collaboration with nationalist forces to form the German State Party (DStP).

When the National Socialists took power in 1933, Lüders' activities came to an abrupt halt. Her writing was banned, save for one publication about women's social work during the 1914-1918 war; the women's associations of which she had been a member were disbanded. In 1937, she was imprisoned by the Gestapo, but released after four months, after international protests from women's rights groups and diplomats alike.

After the war, Lüders was first voted into the Berlin City Assembly and later obtained a seat in the German Bundestag (1953–61). In 1953 and 1957, she was named '‘Alterspräsidentin‘‘ of the German Bundestag – an honorific approximately equivalent of that of Mother of the House. She was not technically the oldest member, but Konrad Adenauer, being Federal Chancellor, had renounced the title. Though there are no set rules, the Alterspräsident traditionally gives the first speech of the legislative period.

During her time in parliament, Lüders again laid a priority on women's rights and social policy. The so-called "Lex Lüders" – a law governing the rights of foreigners married to German citizens – was unofficially named after her.

Marie-Elisabeth Lüders remained unmarried and had one son.

She resigned from parliament in 1961 and died five years later on 23 March 1966 in West Berlin.
