= Erhard Ernst von Röder =

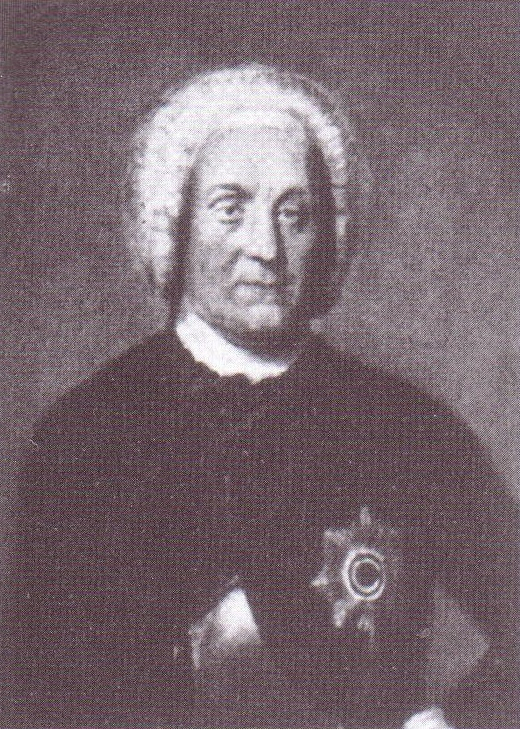
Erhard Ernst von Röder

Erhard Ernst von Röder (26 July 1665 – 26 October 1743) was a Prussian Field Marshal General, Minister of War and Minister of Finance.

== Life ==
Röder was a native of Königsberg, Brandenburg-Prussia. From 1689 Röder served as Hauptmann (Captain) of the regiment Kurprinz. As leader of the Leibkompanie, he had a close relationship with King Frederick William I of Prussia. Röder served in the War of the Spanish Succession and then returned as a colonel and brigadier to Prussia.

In 1705 Röder was appointed commandant of the fortress Plassenburg. In 1714, he was promoted to major general and returned to Prussia. Then in 1728 he was promoted to Commander-in-Chief of all troops and fortifications in the Duchy of Prussia then again in 1736 to First Minister of War and of Finance.

In 1734 Röder was again sent into the field. Together with the Prussian Auxiliary Corps, he went to the Rhine, with Prince Eugene to wage war against France in the War of the Polish Succession. He died at the estate Juditten near Königsberg.
