= Battle of Königsberg =

1945 battle of World War II, during the Great Patriotic War

Coordinates: 54.7167°N 20.5167°E

- Part of the Eastern Front, East Prussian offensive of World War II
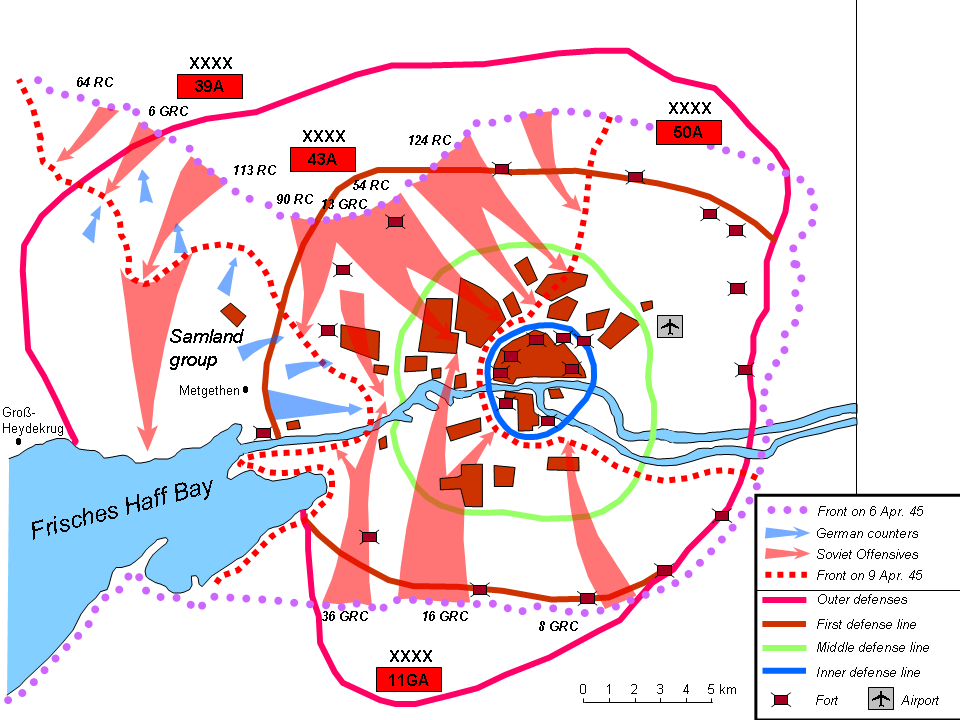
- Königsberg defenses and Soviet attack from 6 to 9 April 1945.
Date	Late January to 9 April 1945; Final assault: 6–9 April 1945
Location	Königsberg, Germany (now Kaliningrad, Russia)
Result	Soviet victory
Territorial changes	Königsberg and its surrounding areas are annexed by the Soviet Union as per the Potsdam Agreement

Belligerents
Germany	Soviet Union

Commanders and leaders
Otto Lasch (POW)	Ivan Chernyakhovsky †; Aleksandr Vasilevsky; Ivan Bagramyan; Vladimir Tributs; Ivan Lyudnikov

Strength
60,000–130,000, 4,000 artillery guns and mortars, 108 tanks and assault guns, 170 aircraft	137,000 (24,500 participated in active phase with rest supporting), 5,200 artillery guns and mortars, 528 tanks and SPG, 2174 aircraft

Casualties and losses
50,000 killed and wounded 80,000 taken prisoner According to Soviet information, the Germans lost 42,000 soldiers killed and wounded and 92,000 people were captured, about 25–30,000 of those captured were civilians.	Total Unknown. Russian sources state at least 3,700 killed for the final assault

The Battle of Königsberg, also known as the Königsberg offensive, was one of the last operations of the East Prussian offensive during World War II. In four days of urban warfare, Soviet forces of the 1st Baltic Front and the 3rd Belorussian Front captured the city of Königsberg, present day Kaliningrad, Russia. The siege started in late January 1945 when the Soviets initially surrounded the city. Heavy fighting took place for control of overland connection between Königsberg and the port of Pillau, but by March 1945 Königsberg was hundreds of kilometres behind the main front line in the eastern front. The battle ended when the German garrison surrendered to the Soviets on 9 April after a three-day assault made their position untenable.

== Beginning ==
The East Prussian offensive was planned by the Soviet Stavka to prevent flank attacks on the armies rushing towards Berlin. Indeed, East Prussia held numerous troops that could be used for this. During initial Stavka planning, Joseph Stalin ordered Marshal Konstantin Rokossovsky to annihilate the Wehrmacht forces trapped there.

On 13 January 1945, almost 1,500,000 troops supported by several thousand tanks and aircraft of the 3rd Belorussian Front (11th Guards, 39th, 43rd, 50th, 1st Air, 3rd Air, 4th Air, and 15th Air Armies) entered East Prussia, which had been transformed into a gigantic web of fortifications, defensive lines and minefields. Progress was initially very slow. Red Army troops only advanced 1.5 kilometers the first day, through only three defensive lines. In five days, taking heavy losses, Soviet troops advanced only 20 kilometers and were unable to break through German lines into open ground.

The initial setback did not last and on 24 January Soviet advance forces reached the shores of the Vistula Lagoon (part of the Baltic Sea), cutting off the German forces in East Prussia from a direct connection with Germany, forcing the Germans to supply the surrounded forces by sea. This operation was accomplished by the 1st Baltic Front under the command of Ivan Bagramyan.

== Prelude and initial attacks ==
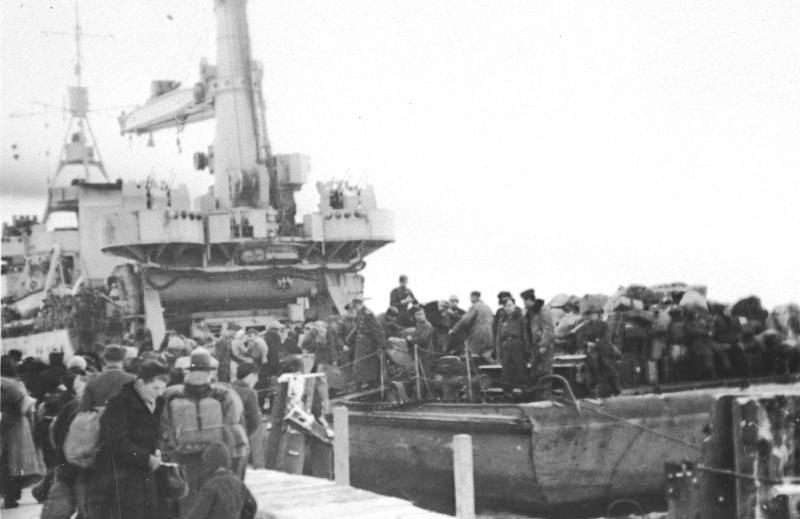
Germans fleeing the encircled Königsberg aboard SS Wedel

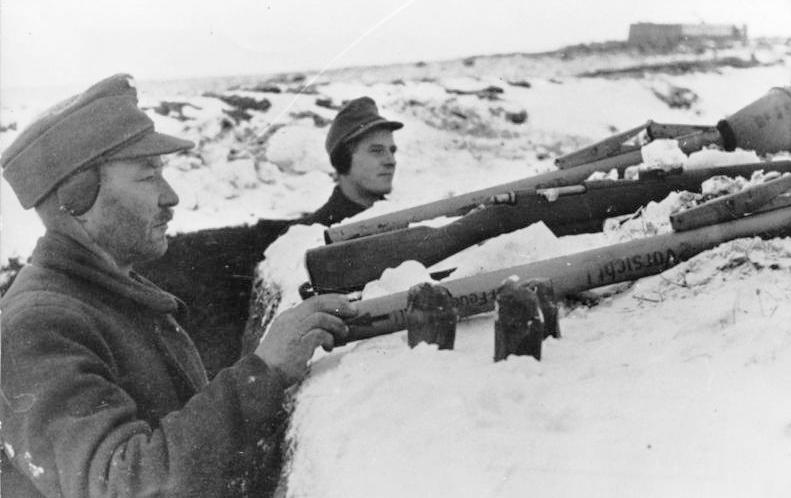
Volkssturm troops with Panzerfausts in a trench during the battle

On 25 January 1945, in a tacit acknowledgement that German forces in East Prussia and the Courland Pocket were far behind the new front line, Hitler renamed three army groups. Army Group North became Army Group Courland; Army Group Centre (the army group surrounded in the Königsberg pocket) became Army Group North and Army Group A became Army Group Centre.

Those forces, now redesignated as Army Group North, were compressed by further Soviet attacks into three pockets: one around Königsberg, one on the adjacent Sambia Peninsula, and one on the coast of the Vistula Lagoon to the south-west (the Heiligenbeil Pocket).

By late January 1945 the 3rd Belorussian Front had surrounded Königsberg on the landward side, severing the road down the Samland peninsula to the port of Pillau, and trapping the 3rd Panzer Army and approximately 200,000 civilians in the city. The civilian provisions were so meagre that civilians were faced with three bleak alternatives:

1. Remain in the city and starve – rations were cut during the siege to 180 grams of bread a day
2. Cross the front lines and leave themselves at the mercies of the Soviets
3. Cross the ice of the Vistula Lagoon to Pillau in hope of finding a place on an evacuation ship

Hundreds chose to cross the front line, but about 2,000 women and children a day chose to cross the ice on foot to Pillau. On his return from a visit to Berlin, Erich Koch, the Gauleiter of East Prussia, chose to stay in the relative safety of Pillau to organize the evacuation rather than return to Königsberg. The first evacuation steamer from Pillau carrying 1,800 civilians and 1,200 casualties reached safety on the 28 January. The only remaining way to escape Königsberg to Pillau was through Metgethen, a strategically important quarter. On the 29th, it was attacked by the Red Army and completely overrun. Throughout February, there was desperate fighting as the Germans tried to maintain the narrow connection between Königsberg and Samland. For a time, Soviet troops were successful in severing that connection and cutting the city off completely.

On 19 February the 3rd Panzer Army and the 4th Army attacked from the direction of Pillau, managing to force open a corridor from Königsberg to Pillau. Led by a captured Soviet T-34 tank, this attack was spearheaded by the 1st Infantry Division from Königsberg, intended to link with General Hans Gollnick's XXVIII Corps, which held parts of the Samland peninsula, including the vital port of Pillau. Capturing the town of Metgethen, the unit opened the way for the 5th Panzer Division to join with Gollnick's forces near the town of Gross Heydekrug the next day. This action solidified the German defence of the area until April, re-opening the land route from Königsberg to Pillau, through which supplies could be delivered by ship and the wounded and refugees could be evacuated. This month-long battle is sometimes called the First Siege of Königsberg.

In March the situation had stabilized – by now, the main front line had moved hundreds of kilometres to the west, and capturing the city took a much lower priority for the Soviets. Even so, the garrison was intact and showed no signs of surrender. Eventually, the Soviet command decided to capture the city by assault rather than a siege.

== Preparation ==
Assaulting Königsberg was not to be an easy task. Garrisoned inside the city were five divisions (61st, 69th and 367th Infantry Divisions, 548th and 561st Volksgrenadier Divisions), for a total of 130,000 troops, along with impressive defensive positions constructed in 1888 that included fifteen forts interconnected by tunnels with integrated accommodations for the troops, and designed to withstand the bombardment of super-guns being designed in that era following the siege of Paris (1870–1871). The Germans still held a narrow land connection to the adjacent German pocket on the Samland peninsula. The capture of the city necessitated this frantically shielded connection be separated. The German troops on the peninsula, the so-called Samland Group, could be expected to stage counter-attacks to prevent this from happening.

Königsberg was, according to Winston Churchill, "a modernised heavily defended fortress". Three concentric rings of fortifications surrounded the city: the outer ring of defences reinforced by 12 forts outside the town, the middle ring in the outskirts and the inner city, a single fortress of anti-tank defences, barricades and landmines, along with several other forts.

In order to face such defensive power, the Soviet command planned to heavily rely on aviation and artillery support, with densities reaching 250 guns per kilometre in some areas. The German troops were also subjected to propaganda, explaining that their resistance was futile, and that the front line was far behind them — that they were trapped in a "pocket" and that it would be best to surrender. However, this propaganda had little to no effect.

After four days of preparatory artillery bombardment, the assault started on 6 April 1945. The assault was planned to be "star-like". Troops would attack from many points around the perimeter and meet in the center of the city, compartmentalising the remaining defenders into isolated groups incapable of mutual support. There were two main fronts: North (held by the 39th and 43rd Armies which included the 208th Rifle Division) and South (11th Guards Army). The 50th Army was stationed in the northeast part of the front. One corps was to hold the line while two corps with a total of six rifle divisions, plus artillery, armor and engineer reinforcements, took part in the attack.

=== Involvement of the German anti-fascists ===
Shortly before the assault, small Combat Groups (German: Kampfgruppen) of the National Committee for a Free Germany (NKFD), an organization formed mostly of the German POWs in the USSR, took part in combat on the side of the Red Army. It was one of the small units sent for reconnaissance and infiltration of German troops and subsequent disarmament and capture of the latter, or for auxiliary combat operations. Throughout 1944, NKFD created commandos, and as 1945 began, it was allowed for the NKFD to form companies; members of the Combat Groups carried German weapons and were dressed in Wehrmacht uniforms. A number of units consisting of "graduates" of the NKFD "anti-fascist schools" attached to the Zemland Group of Forces of the Red Army were sent to Königsberg and other places of East Prussia.

On 22 March, a company of 58 men led by Lieutenant Alfred Peter was sent to Königsberg; four other members of the NKFD were sent with the Combat Group to spread pro-Soviet and anti-fascist propaganda. It returned with 35 German soldiers captured including Oberleutnant Grünwald; one member of the Combat Group was killed and two more were wounded during the operation.

General Otto Lasch described an operation conducted by one such group on 23 March in his memoir So fiel Königsberg:

At the end of March, a large group of soldiers in German uniforms appeared at the posts of the 561st People's Grenadier Division at the Landgraben, claiming to be deserters. They demanded to be led to the company command post, and the guard, believing that they were deserters from captivity, showed them the way. When they arrived in the company commander's bunker, they suddenly pulled out their hidden submachine guns and opened fire. In the resulting confusion, they managed to overpower about 20 men of the weak company and escape with them across the Russian lines. So we had to realize to our horror that now, when we were in the heaviest battle for the East Prussian homeland, German soldiers from the Seydlitz group were fighting in the most underhanded way against their own, struggling comrades. We could no longer think of a useful recipe for how our own soldiers should behave in such cases. The fight seemed to have become pointless if Germans were now fighting against Germans.

— Der Endkampf // Otto Lasch. So fiel Königsberg

The operation held on 5 April was less successful: a group of 79 men again led by Peter attempted to wedge into the 367th Division. The group managed to overpower one machine gun crew, but retreated under heavy fire. On the last day of the assault on Königsberg, on April 9, two groups of parlimentaires were formed from a Combat Group, but they also retreated under heavy fire.

== Assault ==
=== 6 April 1945 ===
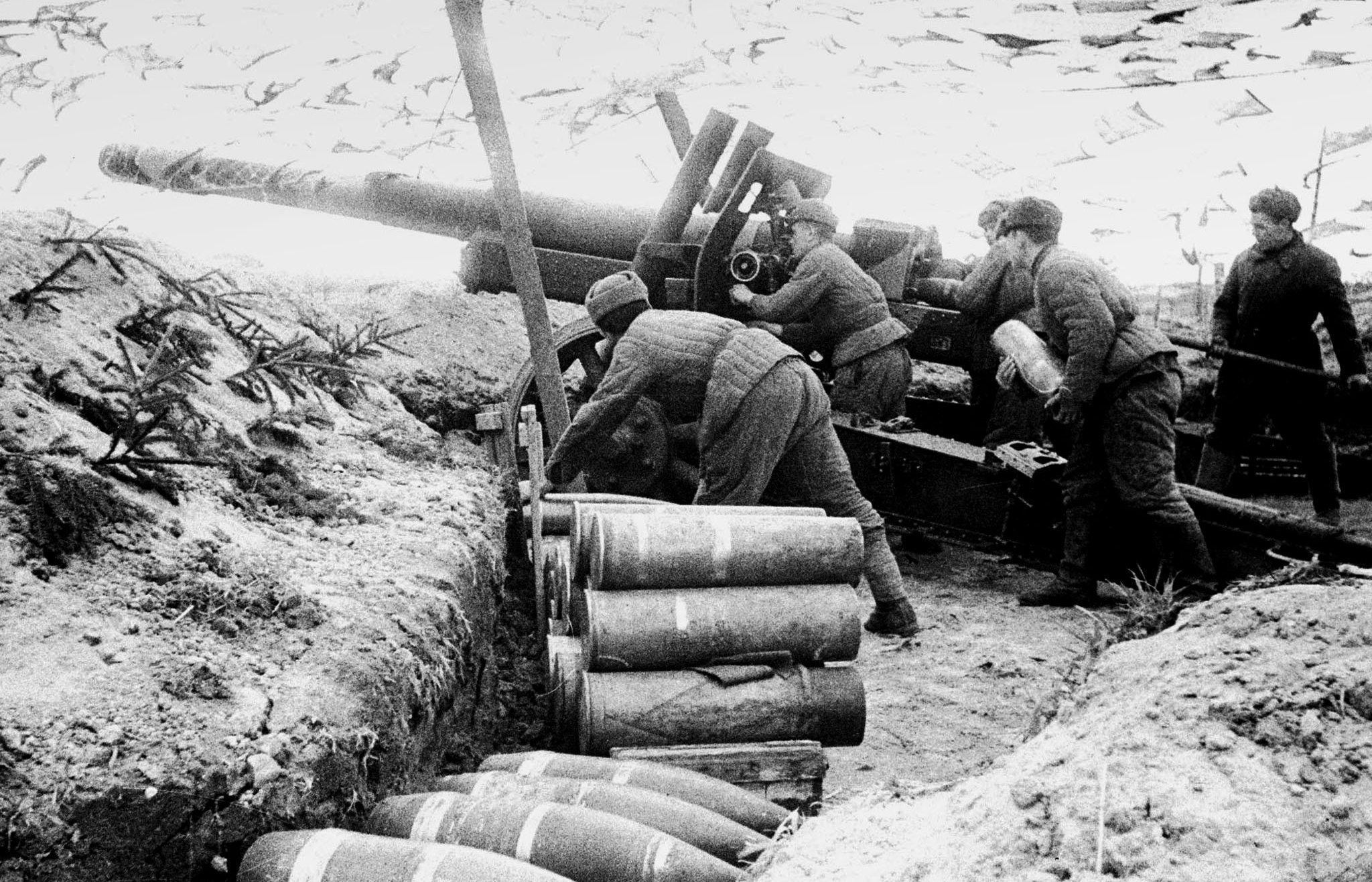
A 152 mm ML-20 field howitzer of the 7th Guards Gun Artillery Regiment (5th Guards Breakthrough Artillery Corps) opens fire in the vicinity of Koenigsberg

In the southern sector of the front, the assault began at sunrise with heavy shelling, enduring three hours, trailed by the primary assault wave. The Soviet rifle divisions quickly went through the first defense line, because its defenders had been largely eliminated and the remainder were demoralized by several days of intense bombing. By noon, the Soviet leading regiments reached the second defensive line, where their progression was halted by stronger opposition, forcing Soviet commanders to use their reserve forces. Three hours later, the second defense line was overrun in several places.

An especially bitter fight raged in the vicinity of Fort Eight. Built at the end of the 19th century and modernized since, the fort had thick walls, considerable firepower and was surrounded by a deep moat, making a frontal assault almost impossible. Despite heavy artillery fire, its defenders prevented any attempt to approach the walls. Only at dusk were Soviet forces able to reach the moat and start using explosives to try to breach the walls.

In the main attack axis in the north, the attack started at the same time. By noon, the first defense line had fallen and the second line was badly shaken and broken in several places. In the afternoon, however, progress became increasingly slow, especially on the right flank, where German forces stationed in the western outskirts of the city (the so-called Samland Group) attempted several flanking attacks.

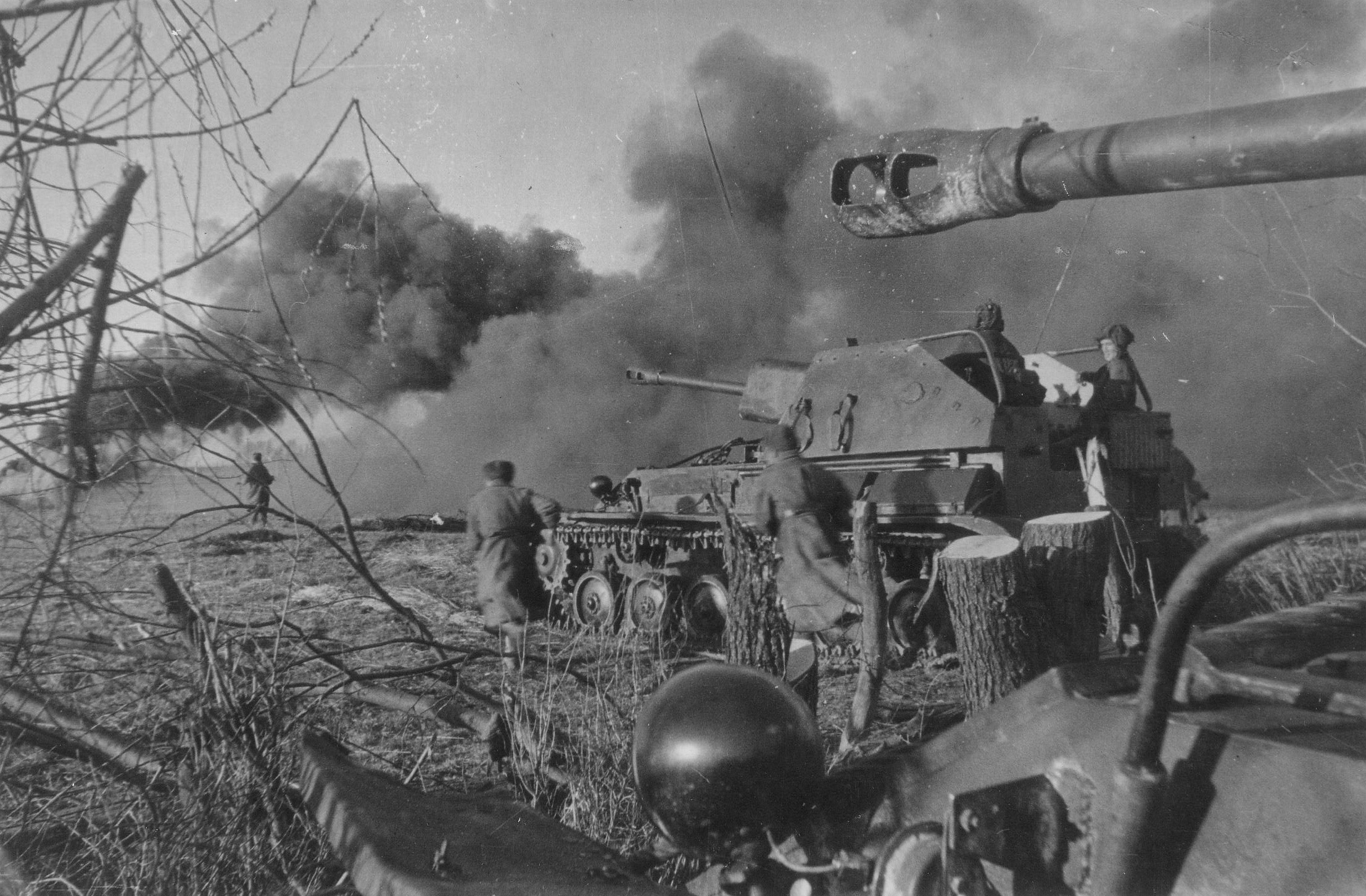
Soviet infantry attacking in the vicinity of Koenigsberg, supported by SU-76 assault guns

Fort Five, claimed to be the best fortification of the entire Königsberg position, formed a strong resistance point. In front of such a situation, Soviet commanders decided to surround it and leave it behind, leaving the rear guard troops time to prepare a new assault.

At dusk the battle stalled, allowing both sides to consolidate their lines, regroup their forces and bring reserves to the front line. This first day had mixed results, since Soviet progress was not as good as expected. However, both city defenses and the defenders' morale were seriously shaken, and troops, including officers, began to surrender periodically.

During this first day of assault, bad weather prevented the Soviet troops from using precision bombing with as much effect as they would have liked. Additionally, even fortified, the terrain conquered by the Soviet troops during this day was not so densely populated as the central city would be, reducing problems associated with urban warfare.

=== 7 April 1945 ===
During the night, the German troops attempted several counterattacks, using their last reserves. Despite the bitter engagements and heavy losses on both sides, the counterattacks were driven off. The most active part of the front was still the one facing the Samland group, where a dozen such counterattacks were attempted.

Better weather conditions allowed the Red Army to make good use of daylight precision bombing. Several hundred bombers belonging to 1st, 3rd and 15th Air Armies, supported with Baltic Fleet aviation, bombarded the downtown and the Samland Group's bridgeheads.

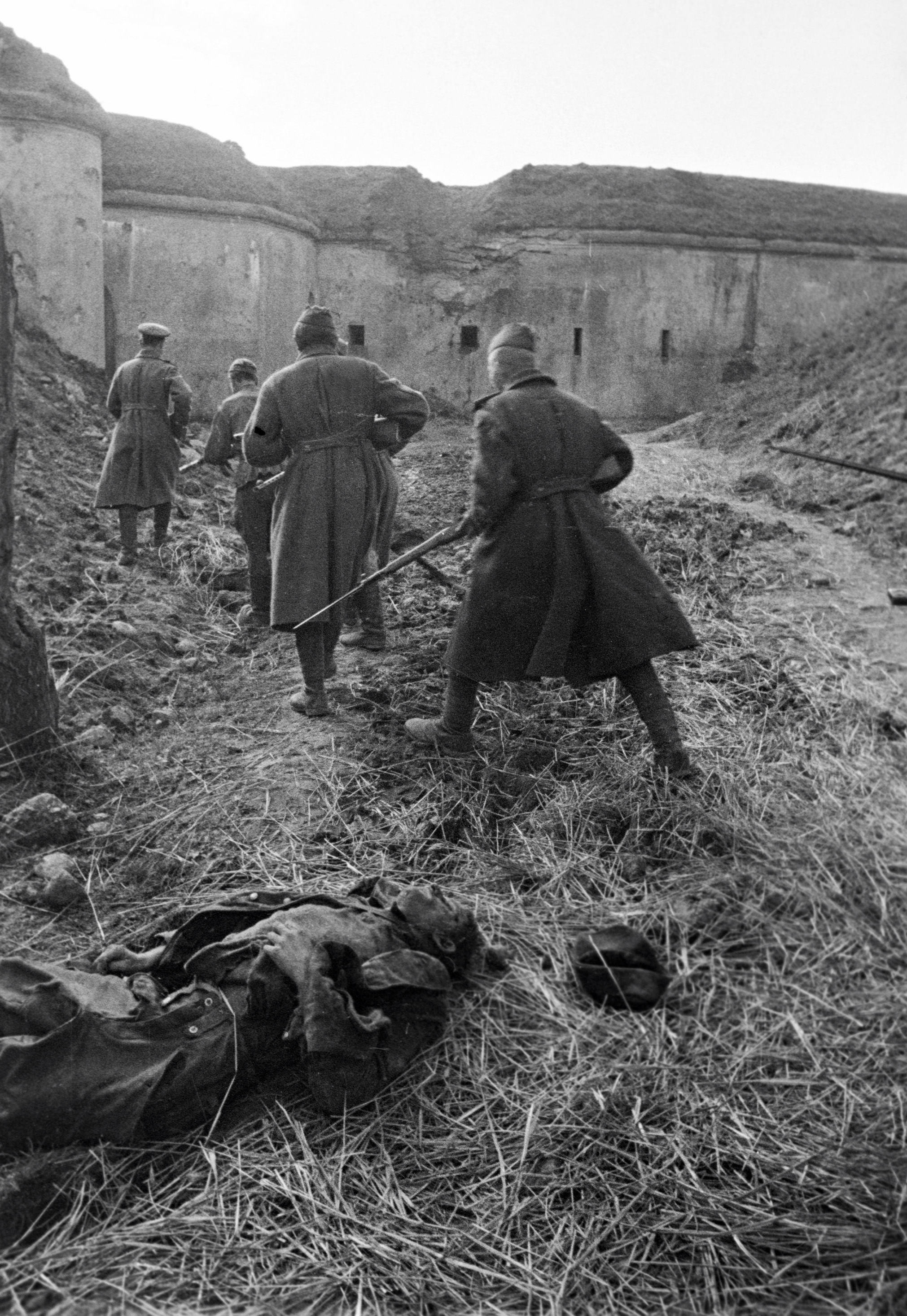
Soviet infantry passing the corpse of a German soldier at Fort Four

Meanwhile, Fort Eight, blocked by Soviet troops, was still a strong pocket of resistance. After several unsuccessful attacks, a more cunning plan was developed. Using smoke screens to conceal their approach and flamethrowers to weaken the defense positions, several hundred men managed to cross the moat and enter the fortress, where bitter close combat began. Once the outer defenses were weakened, a massive frontal assault began. Finally, the assault succeeded and the remainder of the garrison surrendered.

During the day, the 11th Guards Army sought to reach the Pregel river, eliminating all resistance on the southern side. However, their advance was slowed in the central area of the city, where every building had to be literally taken apart along with its defenders. A particularly bitter skirmish took place in the main railway station and its platforms, where almost every railcar was transformed into a firing point, and Soviet troops had to use armor and gun support to advance, taking heavy losses. Only by dusk was the area completely neutralized, allowing the attackers to approach the third inner defence perimeter, protecting the entrance to the city centre itself.

In the north, Fort Five proved to be a strong pocket of resistance as well. Soviet sappers finally managed to place explosives at the base of the walls, breaching them and allowing for a direct assault. As with the assault on Fort Eight, bitter close combat began in the fort, lasting all night and ceasing only in the morning when the last troops surrendered.

At the end of the day, seeing that further resistance was pointless, General Otto Lasch radioed Adolf Hitler's headquarters and asked for permission to surrender. Hitler's answer was "fight to the last soldier".

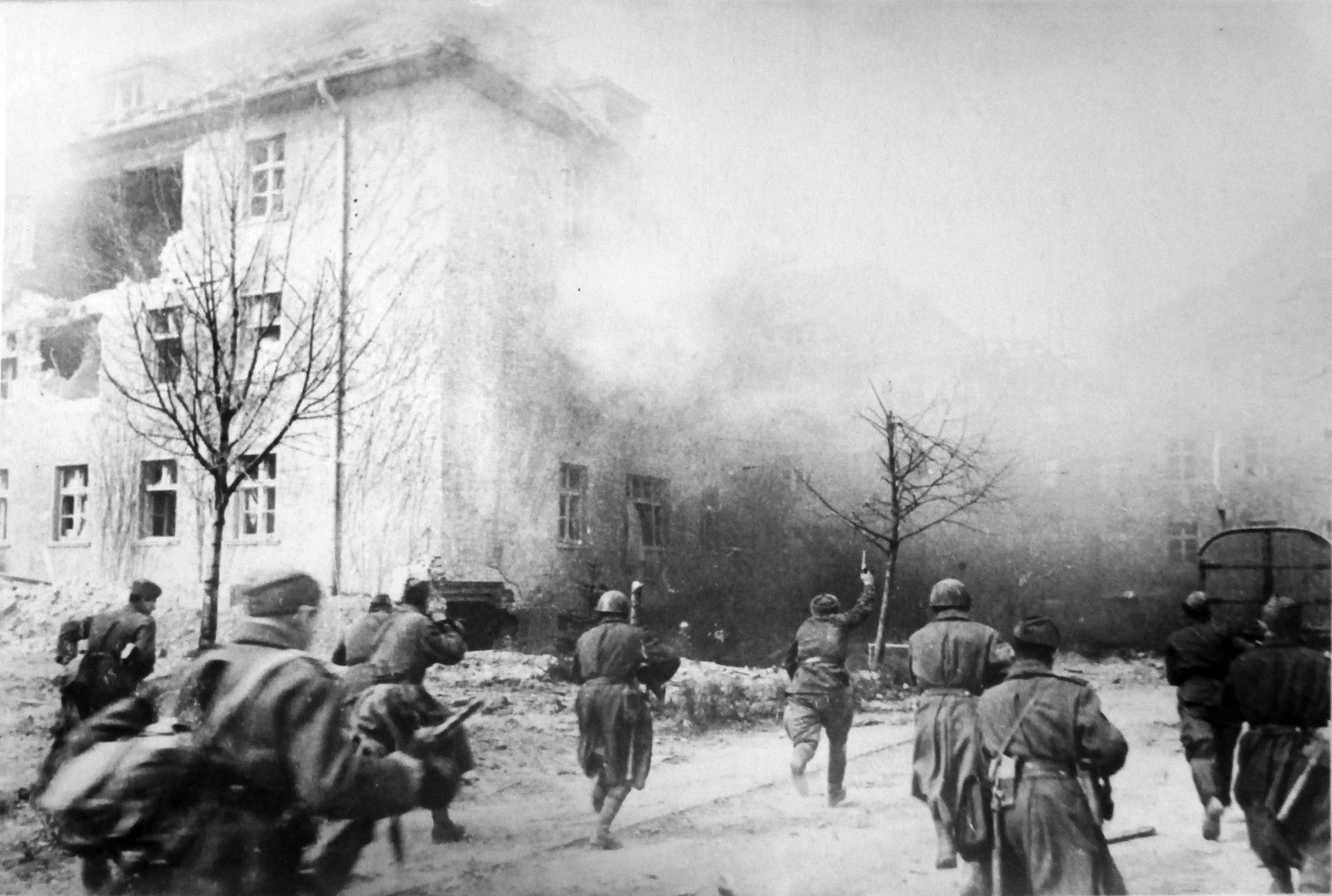
Street fighting in Koenigsberg, 9 April

=== 8 April 1945 ===
During the night, the Pregel was crossed by the 11th Guards Army and despite enemy fire by dawn a full bridgehead was established on the opposite bank. Continuing their advance northwards, they linked up with the northern troops, completing the encirclement and cutting off the Samland group from the city.

In the afternoon, Marshal Aleksandr Vasilevsky once again asked the defenders to surrender. This offer was refused and the German forces attempted to break out of the encirclement, attacking both from the city centre and the Samland bridgehead. The latter managed to advance several kilometres before being stopped. Although another attack was prepared, the Germans' lack of air defenses allowed Soviet Ilyushin Il-2 ground attack aircraft to destroy a large number of troops. During this campaign, Soviet aviation generally proved very effective.

By the end of the day, it was clear that any attempt by the Samland group to break out of the encirclement would be pointless. However, victory was nowhere near, as almost 40,000 men were garrisoned in the city centre, which was regularly subjected to heavy shelling.

=== 9 April 1945 ===
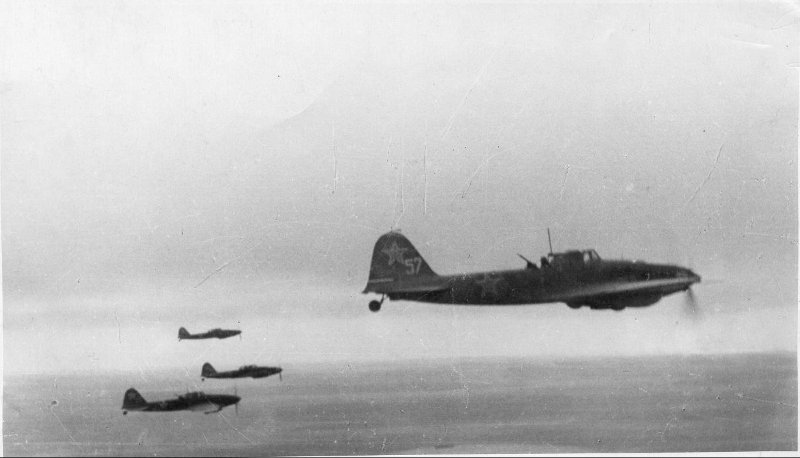
Ilyushin Il-2 ground attack aircraft of the 766th Assault Aviation Regiment (211th Assault Aviation Division, 3rd Air Army) over Koenigsberg, 9 April

During the last day of the battle, the besieged German defenders were overwhelmed and the defence coordination fell apart. Having been comprehensively defeated, and in the realisation that further resistance was futile, Otto Lasch decided on his own initiative to send emissaries to negotiate the surrender. At 18:00, the emissaries arrived at the Soviet lines, and a delegation was sent to Lasch's bunker. Shortly before midnight, the surrender was acknowledged.

== Aftermath ==
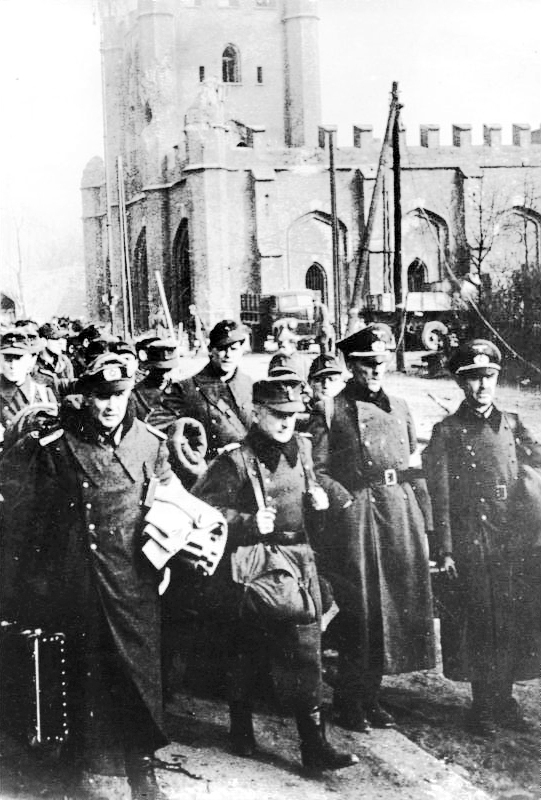
German POWs in front of the King's Gate

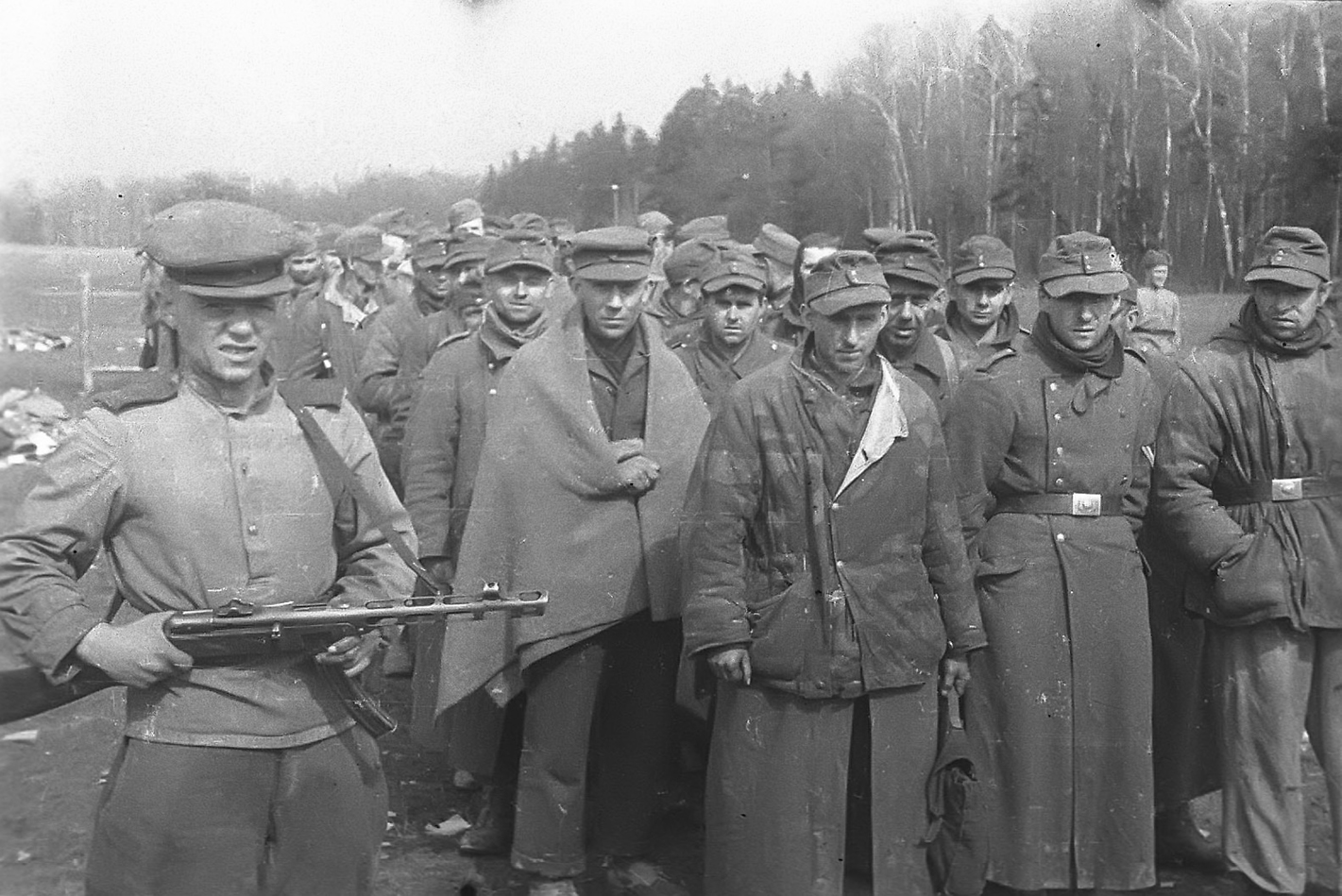
A Soviet infantryman escorts German prisoners of war captured at Königsberg into captivity

Almost 80% of the city was destroyed; first by the Royal Air Force in August 1944, and then by Soviet shelling in April 1945.

During the operation the main forces of German East Prussia group were destroyed. Only the Army Detachment Samland remained operational, but was annihilated by 25 April, in the Soviet Samland offensive.

The operation was a major success for the Soviet Army due to the comparatively low casualties suffered during the capture of the heavily fortified stronghold. The capture was celebrated in Moscow with an artillery salvo by 324 cannons firing 24 shells each. A Medal "For the Capture of Königsberg" was established and 98 military units were named after the Königsberg operation.

After the war, following the transfer of northern half of East Prussia to the Russian SFSR, Königsberg was renamed Kaliningrad, and was installed with predominantly Russian (and, to a lesser extent, Belarusian and Ukrainian) settlers from other areas of the Soviet Union. This area is now known as the Kaliningrad Oblast. It has remained part of Russia as an exclave after the collapse of the USSR, now bordering Poland and Lithuania.

== See also ==
- German World War II strongholds
- East Prussian offensive
- Evacuation of East Prussia
- Metgethen massacre
