= Vzmorye =

Vzmorye Взморье
- Rural locality
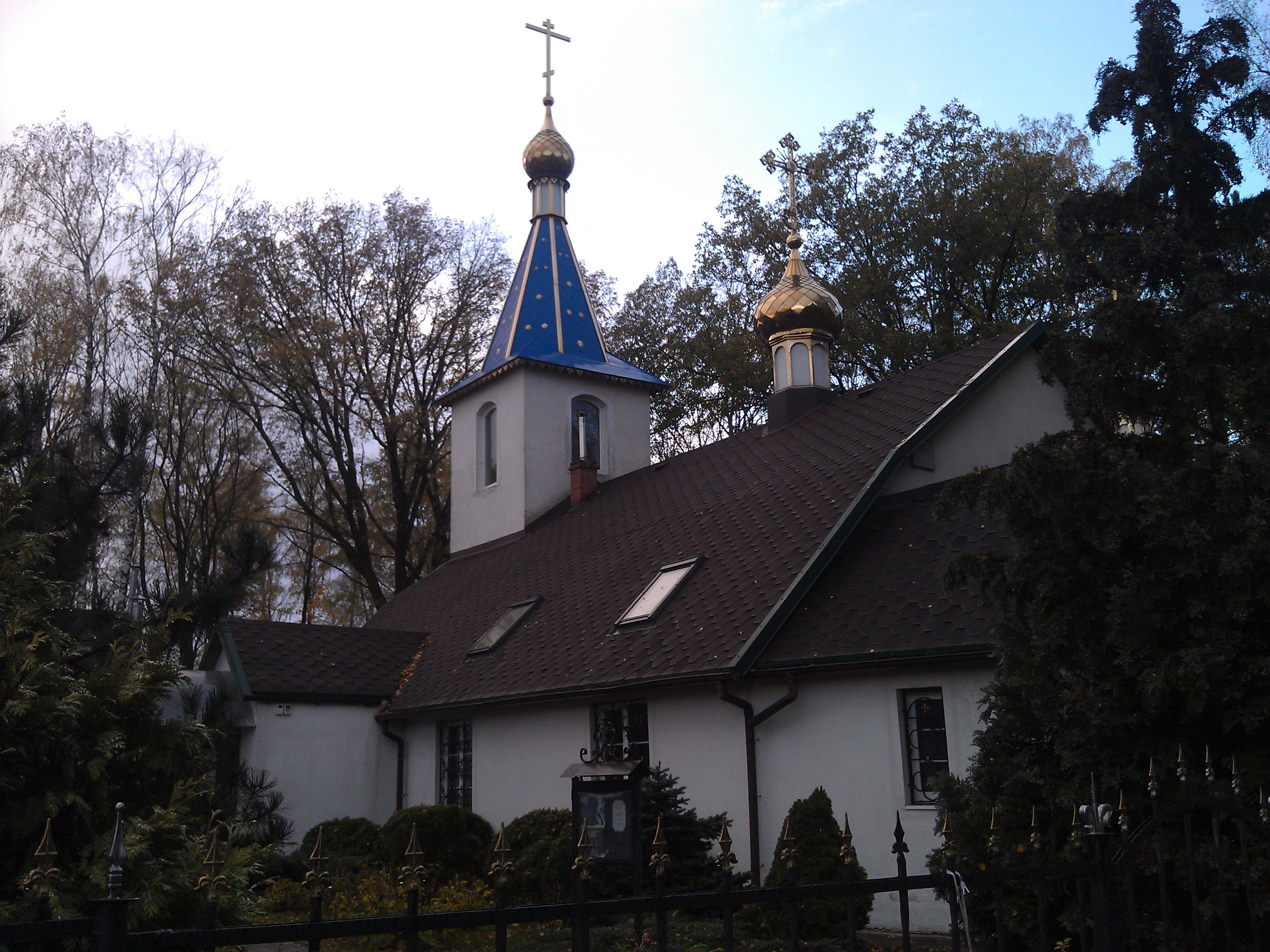
- Saint Elijah the Prophet church
- Interactive map of Vzmorye
- Location of Vzmorye Vzmorye (European Russia) Vzmorye (Russia)
- Coordinates: 54°41′54″N 20°14′38″E
- Country: Russia
- Federal subject: Kaliningrad Oblast
- Administrative district: Svetly

Population (2010 Census)
  - Total: 1,883
  - Estimate (2010): 1,883 (0%)
- Time zone: UTC+2 (MSK–1)
- Postal code: 238345
- OKTMO ID: 27725000116

Vzmorye (Russian: Взмо́рье, German: Groß Heydekrug, Polish: Zajazdowo) is a settlement under the administrative jurisdiction of the town of Svetly in Kaliningrad Oblast, Russia.

== Geography ==
The village is located in the historic region of Prussia, in the southwest of the Sambia Peninsula on the Vistula Lagoon, halfway between Kaliningrad (17 kilometres (11 mi)) and Primorsk (18 kilometres (11 mi)). Regional road 27A-016 (ex A193) runs through what was once the largest village on the lagoon. The nearest train station is Lyublino on the Kaliningrad–Baltiysk railway line.

Population: 1,883 (2010 census);
