= 1793 Zoya =

Main-belt asteroid

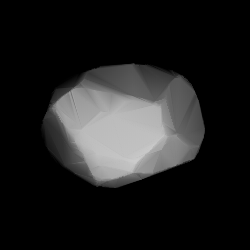
- Shape model of Zoya from its lightcurve

Discovery
- Discovered by: T. Smirnova
- Discovery site: Crimean Astrophysical Obs.
- Discovery date: 28 February 1968

Designations
- Named after: Zoya Kosmodemyanskaya (Hero of the Soviet Union)
- Alternative designations: 1968 DW · 1932 MC; 1933 UV · 1946 TC; 1949 QX · 1951 AE; 1953 VP_{2} · 1953 VW_{1} 1953 XF · 1969 RP_{1}
- Minor planet category: main-belt · Flora

Orbital characteristics
- Epoch 4 September 2017 (JD 2458000.5)
- Uncertainty parameter 0
- Observation arc: 83.44 yr (30,475 days)
- Aphelion: 2.4405 AU
- Perihelion: 2.0067 AU
- Semi-major axis: 2.2236 AU
- Eccentricity: 0.0975
- Orbital period (sidereal): 3.32 yr (1,211 days)
- Mean anomaly: 321.35°
- Inclination: 1.5088°
- Longitude of ascending node: 225.99°
- Argument of perihelion: 323.37°

Physical characteristics
- Dimensions: 8.348±0.301 km 9.41 km (calculated)
- Synodic rotation period: 5.75187±0.00001 h 5.751872±0.000005 h 5.753±0.001 h 7.0 h
- Geometric albedo: 0.24 (assumed); 0.334±0.047
- Spectral type: S
- Absolute magnitude (H): 12.20 · 12.3 · 12.31±0.23

1793 Zoya, provisional designation 1968 DW, is a stony Florian asteroid from the inner regions of the asteroid belt, approximately 9 kilometers in diameter. It was discovered on 28 February 1968, by Russian astronomer Tamara Smirnova at the Crimean Astrophysical Observatory in Nauchnyj, on the Crimean peninsula, and named after World War II partisan Zoya Kosmodemyanskaya.

== Orbit and classification ==
Zoya is a member of the Flora family, a large group of stony S-type asteroids in the inner main-belt. It orbits the Sun in the inner main-belt at a distance of 2.0–2.4 AU once every 3 years and 4 months (1,211 days). Its orbit has an eccentricity of 0.10 and an inclination of 2° with respect to the ecliptic.

First identified as 1932 MC at Johannesburg, Zoya's first used observation was taken at Uccle Observatory in 1933, when it was identified as 1933 UV, extending the asteroid's observation arc by 35 years prior to its official discovery observation.

== Physical characteristics ==
=== Rotation period ===
In May 2008, a rotational lightcurve of Zoya was obtained from photometric observations taken by astronomer James W. Brinsfield (G69), giving a rotation period of 5.753 hours with a brightness variation of 0.40 magnitude (U=2+), superseding a previous period of 7.0 hours obtained by Claes-Ingvar Lagerkvist in 1978 (U=2). Modeled lightcurves published in 2016, gave a period of 5.751872 and 5.75187, respectively (U=n.a.).

=== Diameter and albedo ===
According to the survey carried out by NASA's Wide-field Infrared Survey Explorer with its subsequent NEOWISE mission, Zoya measures 8.35 kilometers in diameter, and its surface has an albedo of 0.334, while the Collaborative Asteroid Lightcurve Link assumes an albedo of 0.24 – derived from 8 Flora, the largest member and namesake of this asteroid family – and calculates a diameter of 9.41 kilometers with an absolute magnitude of 12.3.

== Naming ==
This minor planet was named in memory of Zoya Kosmodemyanskaya (1923–1941), Hero of the Soviet Union, partisan who died at the age of 18 during World War II in the Great Patriotic War. The minor planets 2072 Kosmodemyanskaya and 1977 Shura were named in honour of her mother and brother. The official naming citation was published by the Minor Planet Center on 1 July 1972 (M.P.C. 3297).
