= Zoya Kosmodemyanskaya =

Soviet partisan (1923–1941)

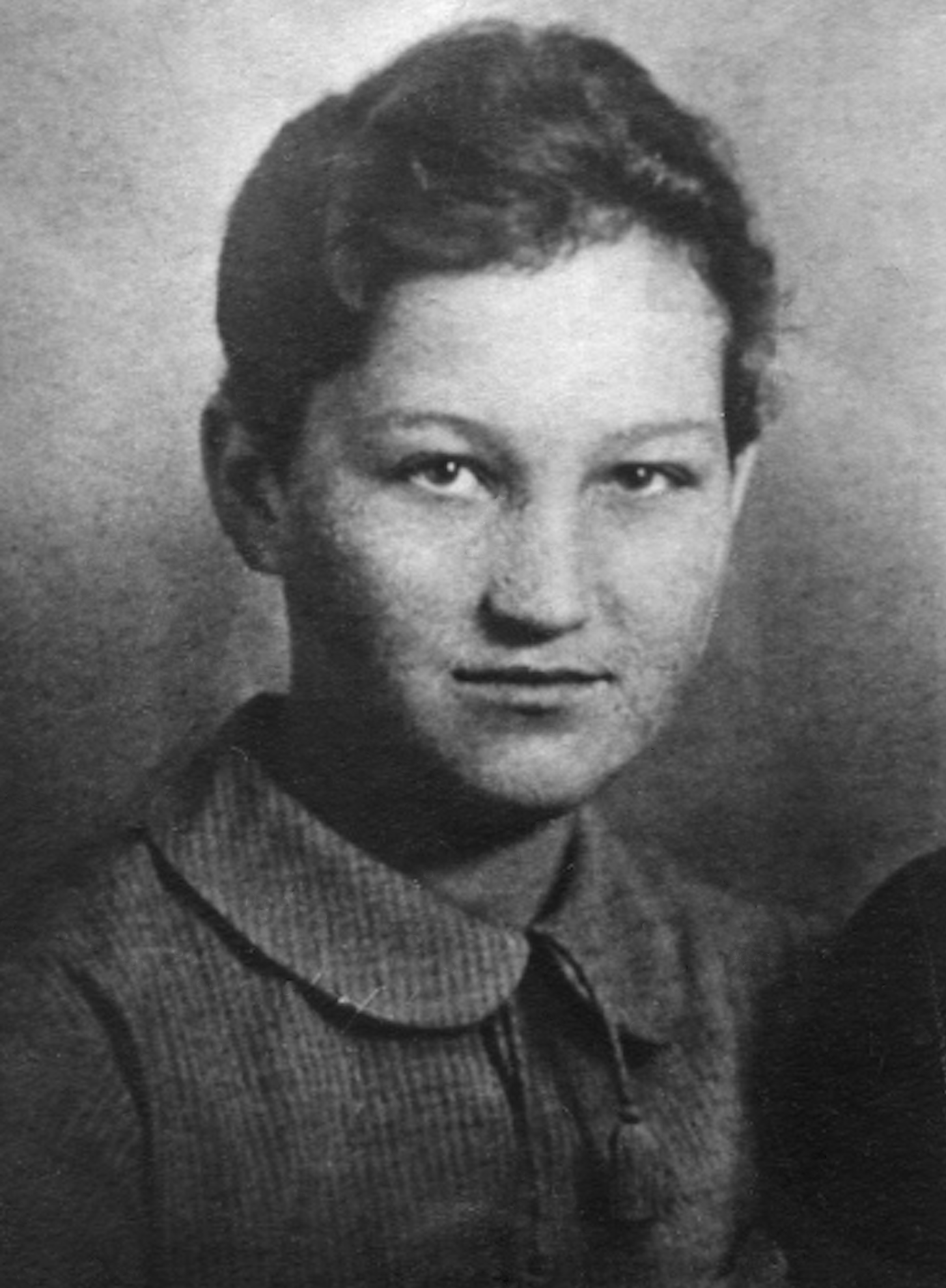
- Born: September 13, 1923; Osino-Gay, Tambov Oblast, Soviet Union
- Died: November 29, 1941 (aged 18) Petrishchevo, Moscow Oblast, German-occupied USSR
- Allegiance: Soviet Union
- Awards: Hero of the Soviet Union; Order of Lenin

Zoya Anatolyevna Kosmodemyanskaya (Russian: Зо́я Анато́льевна Космодемья́нская, IPA: [ˈzojə kəsmədʲɪˈmʲjanskəjə]; September 13, 1923 – November 29, 1941) was a Soviet partisan. She was executed after acts of sabotage against the invading armies of Nazi Germany. After stories emerged of her defiance towards her captors, she was posthumously declared a Hero of the Soviet Union. She became one of the most revered heroines of the Soviet Union.

== Family ==
The Kosmodemyansky family name was constructed by joining the names of Saints Cosmas and Damian (Косма (Kosma) and Дамиан (Demyan) in Russian). From the 17th century, the Kosmodemyansky were priests in the Russian Orthodox Church. Zoya's grandfather Pyotr Kosmodemyansky was murdered in 1918 by militant atheists for his opposition to blasphemy.

Zoya Anatolyevna Kosmodemyanskaya (her name is a Russian form of the Greek name Zoe, which means "life") was born in September 13, 1923 in the village of Osino-Gay (Осино-Гай) (meaning Aspen Woods), near the city of Tambov. Her father, Anatoly Kosmodemyansky, studied in a theological seminary, but did not graduate. He later worked as a librarian. Her mother, Lyubov Kosmodemyanskaya (née Churikova), was a school teacher. In 1925, Zoya's brother, Aleksandr Kosmodemyansky, was born. Like his sister, he was awarded the Hero of the Soviet Union, and, like Zoya, posthumously. In 1929, the family moved to Siberia for fear of persecution. In 1930, they moved to Moscow.

== Life and death ==
Kosmodemyanskaya joined the Komsomol in 1938. In October 1941, still a high school student in Moscow, she volunteered for a partisan unit. During the course of her army service, she idealized Tatiana Solomakha, a Red Army soldier who was tortured and killed during the course of the Russian Civil War. She was assigned to the partisan unit 9903 (Staff of the Western Front). At the village of Obukhovo near Naro-Fominsk, Kosmodemyanskaya and other partisans crossed the front line and entered territory occupied by the Germans. They mined roads and cut communication lines.

On November 27, 1941, Kosmodemyanskaya received an assignment to burn the village of Petrishchevo, where a German cavalry regiment was stationed. Together with fellow partisans Boris Krainov and Vasily Klubkov, she set fire to three houses in the village. The partisans believed that one of the houses was being used as a German communications center and that occupying forces were using others for accommodation. The writer A. Zhovtis has disputed these claims, arguing that officially Petrishchevo was not a point of permanent deployment of German troops. However, the villagers said that virtually all the houses of the village were used for accommodation by the German troops transported along the main roads near the village.

After the first attempt at arson, Krainov did not wait for Kosmodemyanskaya and Klubkov at the agreed meeting place and left, returning to his own. Later, Klubkov was also captured by the Germans. Kosmodemyanskaya, having missed her comrades and left alone, decided to return to Petrishchevo and continue the arson campaign. However, the German military authorities in the village had by then organized a gathering of local residents, forming a militia in order to avoid further arson. After being arrested, Kosmodemyanskaya was stripped, beaten, interrogated and tortured with 200 lashes and her body burnt, but refused to give any information. The following morning she was marched to the center of the village with a board around her neck bearing the inscription 'Houseburner' and hanged.

According to Soviet accounts, final words were:

Hey, comrades! Why are you looking so sad? Be brave, fight, beat the Germans, burn, wipe them out! I'm not afraid to die, comrades. It is happiness to die for one's people!

and to the Germans:

You hang me now, but I'm not alone. There are 200,000,000 of us. You can't hang us all. They will avenge me.

in the Soviet accounts, before the moment of hanging, with the rope on her neck, she said:

Farewell, comrades! Fight, do not be afraid! Stalin is with us! Stalin will come!

The Germans left her body hanging on the gallows for several weeks. One of her breasts was cut off by a drunk German near Christmas Eve, and her body desecrated by Germans or collaborators.

== Legacy ==
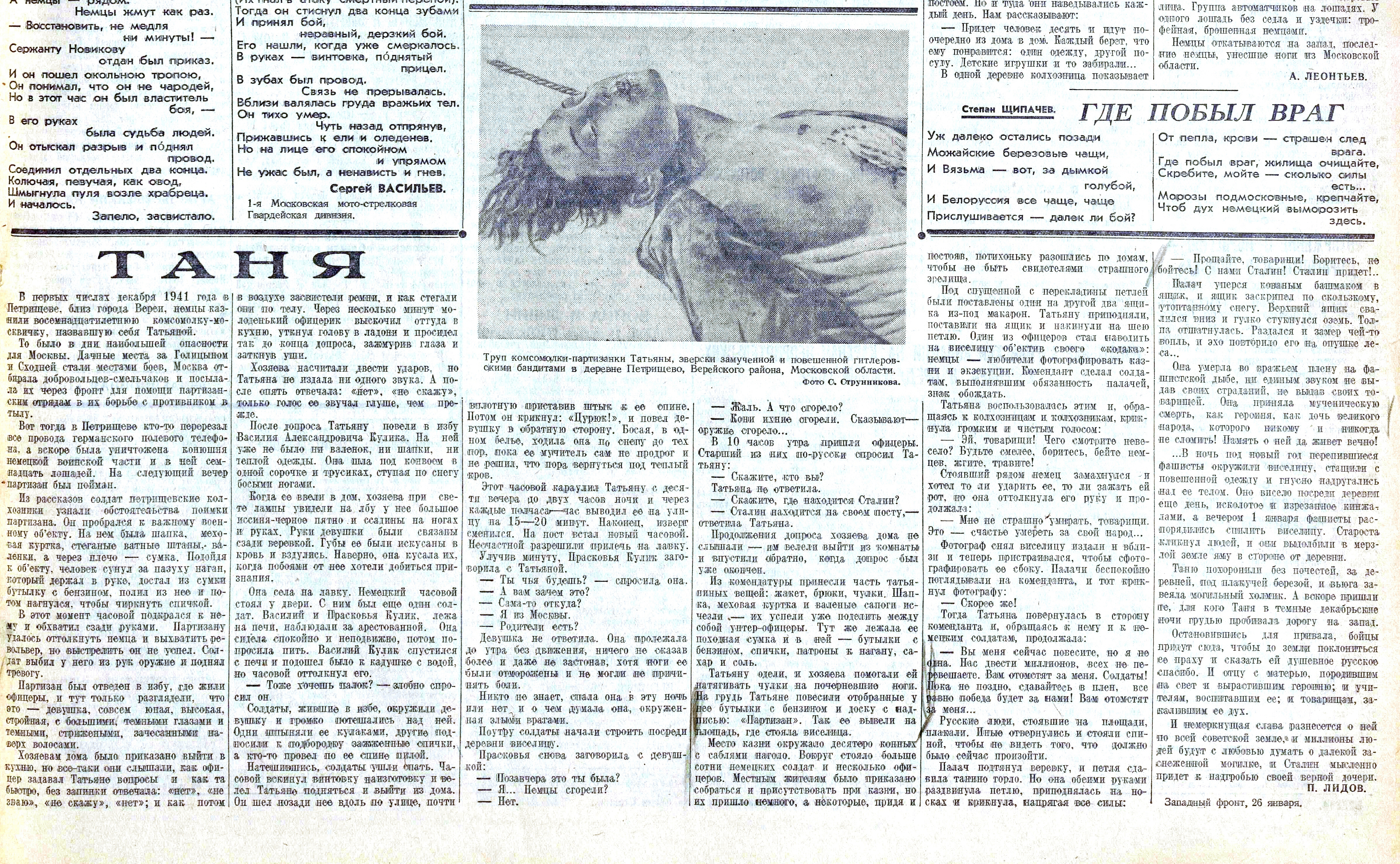
Essay by Pyotr Lidov «Tanya», «Pravda» newspaper, January 27, 1942, photo by Sergei Strunnikov.

The story of Kosmodemyanskaya's death became popular after Pravda published an article written by Pyotr Lidov on January 27, 1942. The journalist had heard about her execution from an elderly peasant, and was impressed by her courage. The witness recounted: "They were hanging her and she was giving a speech. They were hanging her and she was threatening them."

Lidov travelled to Petrishchevo, collected details from local residents and published an article about the then-unknown partisan girl. The article was illustrated by a photograph by Sergei Strunnikov of her exhumed body. According to Russian studies scholar Adrienne Harris, the Pravda article "contained all the hagiographic elements necessary... to ensure Zoya's secular canonization as a Hero of the Soviet Union, and to fix her central position in the pantheon of Soviet saints."

Soon after, Joseph Stalin noticed the article. He proclaimed: "Here is the people's heroine", which started a propaganda campaign honouring Kosmodemyanskaya. Stalin ordered that the soldiers and officers of the 197th Infantry Division (Wehrmacht), which participated in the execution, should not be taken prisoner. In February, she was identified and was awarded the order of Hero of the Soviet Union.

Kosmodemyanskaya's account was repeatedly published in Pravda. Harris writes that "Recognizing the value of Zoya's image and narrative, the Soviet Union quickly began shaping Zoya's image to suit its own purposes... The Komsomol and educational system introduced young people to Zoya through organized museum visits, presentations and politically correct readings... Zoya quickly became the most revered Soviet heroine, and numerous Soviet public monuments to her were commissioned, in a top-down manner."

Numerous Soviet writers, artists, sculptors and poets dedicated their works to her. In 1944, the film Zoya was made about her. She was also referred to in the film Girl No. 217, which depicted atrocities committed against Soviet prisoners of war by the Nazis. Her image was also used frequently in anti-German propaganda which encouraged violence against the German occupying forces.

Many streets, kolkhozes and Pioneer organizations in the Soviet Union were named after Kosmodemyanskaya. Her portrait became a part of ceremonial procedures of commemoration performed by pioneers, and was used as a symbol of the highest distinction awarded to the best class in school. The Soviets erected a monument in her honour not far from the village of Petrishchevo. Another statue is located at the Partizanskaya Moscow Metro station. A 4108-meter (13,478 feet) mountain peak in Trans-Ili Alatau is named after her. A minor planet 1793 Zoya, discovered in 1968 by Soviet astronomer Tamara Mikhailovna Smirnova, is named after her. Kosmodemyanskaya is buried at Novodevichy Cemetery in Moscow.

Zoya Phan, an outspoken political activist for the Karen people and member of the Burma Campaign UK, was named after Zoya Kosmodemyanskaya by her father, Padoh Mahn Sha Lah Phan. He chose the name because he had read about Kosmodemyanskaya while studying at Yangon University and saw several parallels between the Karen resistance against the Burmese government and the Soviet resistance against the Nazis in Europe.

=== Post-Soviet research and controversy ===
==== 1990s media controversy ====
Kosmodemyanskaya's life became a subject of media controversy during the 1990s. In September 1991, an article by Aleksandr Zhovtis was published in the weekly Russian magazine Argumenty i Fakty. The article alleged that there were no German troops in the village of Petrishchevo, in spite of several photos of her being hanged by German soldiers. Zhovtis blamed Stalin's scorched earth policy for the "unnecessary" death of the young woman. The newspaper subsequently published letters from readers, many of which included stories contradicting the mainstream version. One researcher claimed that the person executed in Petrishchevo was not Zoya Kosmodemyanskaya but a "missing in action" partisan, although later official conclusion from the Institute for Criminal Expertise and the Department of Justice of the Russian Federation stated otherwise. The Argumenty i Fakty articles prompted a response from Pravda observer Viktor Kozhemyaka in the form of an article titled "Fifty years after her death Zoya is tortured and executed again". Ten years later, Kozhemyaka wrote another article "Zoya is executed yet again", in which he lamented some "absurd material" on Internet discussion forums, which alleged that Zoya had hurt Russian peasants rather than German troops, that she had schizophrenia, and that she was a fanatical Stalinist.

In 1997, the newspaper Glasnost published the previously unknown protocols of the official commission of residents of Petrishchevo village and Gribtsovsky selsoviet from January 25, 1942 (two months after Zoya's execution). The protocols stated that Kosmodemyanskaya was caught while trying to destroy a stable containing more than 300 German horses. They also described her torture and execution.

A slightly different story was recorded in the notes of researcher Pyotr Lidov, published in Parlamentskaya Gazeta in 1999. According to these, Kosmodemyanskaya and Vasily Klubkov were caught while asleep on the outskirts of Petrishchevo. The Germans were called by Petrishchevo resident Semyon Sviridov. Lidov's notes also included an interview with a German noncommissioned officer taken prisoner by the Red Army. The interview described the negative effect on the morale of the German soldiers who witnessed the burning of the houses.

==== Klubkov's betrayal version ====
Some details of Kosmodemyanskaya's assignment and arrest were classified for about sixty years because treachery might have been involved. The case was declassified in 2002, and then reviewed by Russia's Chief Military Prosecutor Office, and it was decided that Vasily Klubkov, who betrayed Zoya Kosmodemyanskaya, was not eligible for rehabilitation. According to the case, three Soviet combatants, Zoya Kosmodemyanskaya, Vasily Klubkov, and their commander Boris Krainov, had to perform acts of sabotage in Reichskommissariat Ostland. They had been given the task of setting fire to houses in the village of Petrishchevo, where German troops were quartered. Krainov was to operate in the central part of the village, Kosmodemyanskaya in the southern and Klubkov in the northern parts. Krainov was the first to carry out his task and returned to the base. Kosmodemyanskaya performed her task too, and three columns of flame in the southern part of Petrishchevo were seen from the base. Only the northern part was not set on fire. According to Klubkov, he was captured by two German soldiers and taken to their headquarters. A German officer threatened to kill him, and Klubkov gave him the names of Kosmodemyanskaya and Krainov. After this, Kosmodemyanskaya was captured by the Germans.

== See also ==
- List of female Heroes of the Soviet Union
