= Wilhelmsgymnasium (Königsberg) =

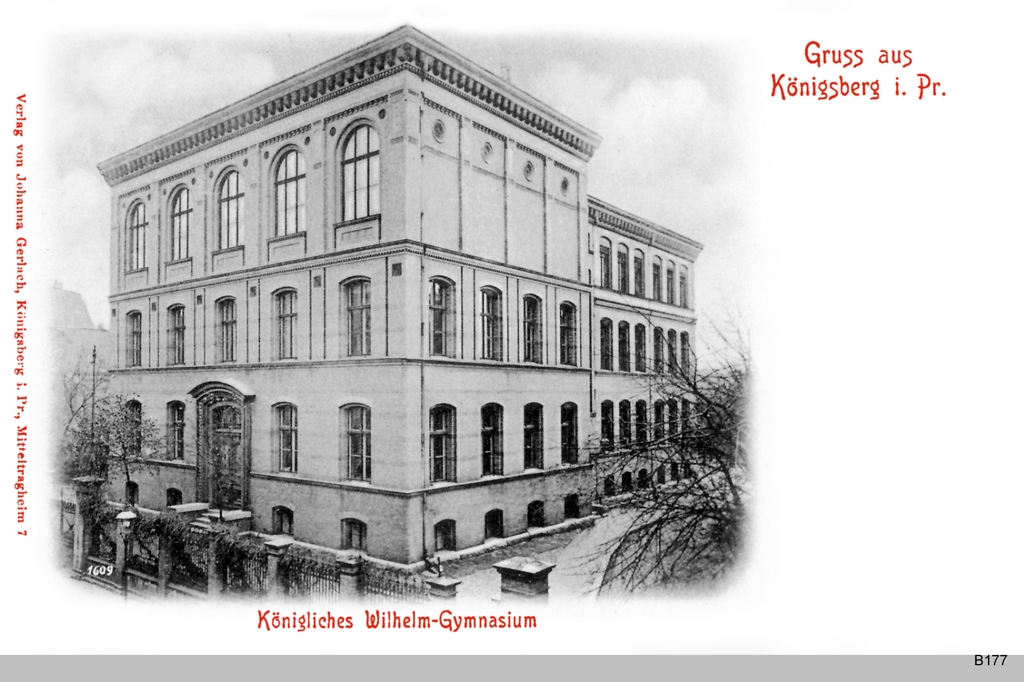

Location
- 54°43′02″N 20°31′02″E

Information
- Established: 15. October 1874
- Status: Closed
- Closed: 1944

The Wilhelmsgymnasium, originally the Königliches Wilhelms-Gymnasium, was a gymnasium in the Tragheim quarter of Königsberg, Germany.

== History ==
The state-founded school was named after William I, German Emperor and King of Prussia. It opened with five classes on 15 October 1874 at its original location on Altroßgärter Predigerstraße in Hinter-Roßgarten. Its first director, Karl Urban of Roßlau, led the effort to move the school to a new building near the Schlossteich in Hintertragheim, which was dedicated in 1879. The main building cost 240,500 Mark, the gym cost 26,200 Mark, and the director's domicile cost 41,100 Mark.

The Wilhelmsgymnasium's auditorium was decorated with East Prussian-themed paintings by artists from Königsberg in 1889, including Carl Steffeck, Emil Neide, and Georg Knorr. Steffeck created a cycle of paintings depicting Prussian history, starting with the entrance of Grand Master Siegfried von Feuchtwangen into Marienburg Castle. The Wilhelmsgymnasium contained busts by Friedrich Reusch of William I and Emil Grosse, who was the director from 1882 to 1903. Grosse was succeeded by Ernst Wilhelm Wagner from 1903 to 1922.

Notable teachers included Otto Portzehl, senior instructor from 1888 to 1905, and Hans Lullies, a geographer who also taught at the Handelshochschule. The school contained 22 teachers and 533 students in 1901 and 19 teachers and 352 students in 1936. Its most famous alumni were the mathematicians David Hilbert and Jürgen Moser, pianist Alfred Reisenauer, and politician Friedrich von Berg. The building was destroyed in 1944 during the bombing of Königsberg in World War II.
