= Friedrichswalde (disambiguation) =

Friedrichswalde may refer to the following places in Germany:

- Friedrichswalde, a municipality in the Barnim district, Brandenburg
- Friedrichswalde (Königsberg), former quarter of Königsberg, Prussia
- A part of Sternberg, Mecklenburg-Vorpommern, in the Parchim district
- A part of Bahretal, in the Sächsische Schweiz district, Saxony

Elsewhere:

- Tarnma, South Australia was known as Friedrichswalde until 1919
