= Moditten =

Moditten was first a suburb of and then a quarter of Königsberg, Germany. Its territory is now part of the Tsentralny District in Kaliningrad, Russia.

Moditten was located between Juditten to the east and Metgethen to the west; farther to the south along the Pregel was Holstein. It was documented in 1258 as Maudytyn and in 1389 as Maydithen, names of Old Prussian origin. The Spittler, an official of the Teutonic Knights in charge of hospital affairs, possessed the Spittelhof manor near Moditten. It was later owned by Johann Schimmelpfennig (1604-69), a Königsberg councillor and vice-mayor of Kneiphof. The philosopher Immanuel Kant was good friends with the Moditten forester Wobeser; the summer house in which Kant stayed has been preserved. Moditten's forestry house was visited by tourists and praised for its Kopskiekelwein, a type of currant wine.

Moditten was incorporated into the city of Königsberg in 1939.
