= Friedrich Lahrs =

German architect and professor

Johann Ludwig Friedrich Lahrs (11 July 1880 – 13 March 1964) was a German architect and professor.

== Life ==
Lahrs was born in Königsberg, East Prussia. After attending the Löbenicht Realgymnasium, Lahrs studied at the Technical University in Charlottenburg in 1898. He worked in Berlin and Charlottenburg until 1908; in 1906 he was awarded the Schinkelpreis in honor of Karl Friedrich Schinkel. In 1908 Lahrs began working at the Kunstakademie in his native Königsberg. He served as architectural professor at the Kunstakademie from 1911 to 1934.

Lahrs' most prominent designs included the Kunsthalle (completed 1913) in Tragheim and the new Kunstakademie (completed 1919) after it moved to Ratshof. In 1920 Lahrs and Stanislaus Cauer designed a memorial in the Gemeindefriedhof cemetery near Rothenstein and Maraunenhof; the memorial honored 200 workers killed in a munitions explosion in Rothenstein.

Lahrs also designed the new mausoleum for Immanuel Kant near Königsberg Cathedral in 1924. In the same year he designed a regimental memorial at Brandenburg Gate honoring casualties from Königsberg's foot artillery during World War I. In 1926 he led an excavation of the courtyard of Königsberg Castle. Two years later he designed the provincial finance office, the Landesfinanzamt, just outside Neurossgarten. Lahrs also designed the bookstore Gräfe und Unzer.

Lahrs remained at the Kunstakademie until 1934, when he retired his professorship after the appointment of Kurt Frick to the academy during Gleichschaltung. Lahrs was married to Maria Lahrs, a painter and silhouette artist, with whom he had three daughters. After being expelled from Königsberg in 1945 as a result of World War II, Lahrs settled in Stuttgart. In 1956 he published Das Königsberger Schloß, an architectural history of Königsberg Castle. Lahrs died in 1964 after an auto accident in Stuttgart.

== Gallery ==
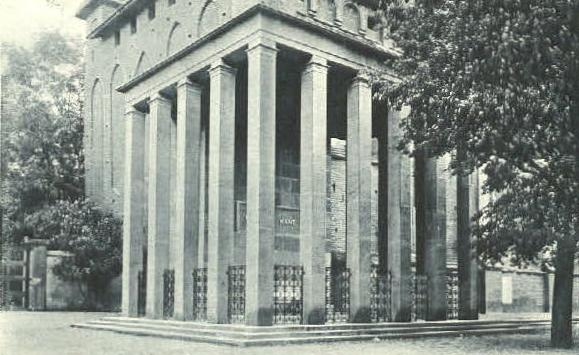
Kant Mausoleum

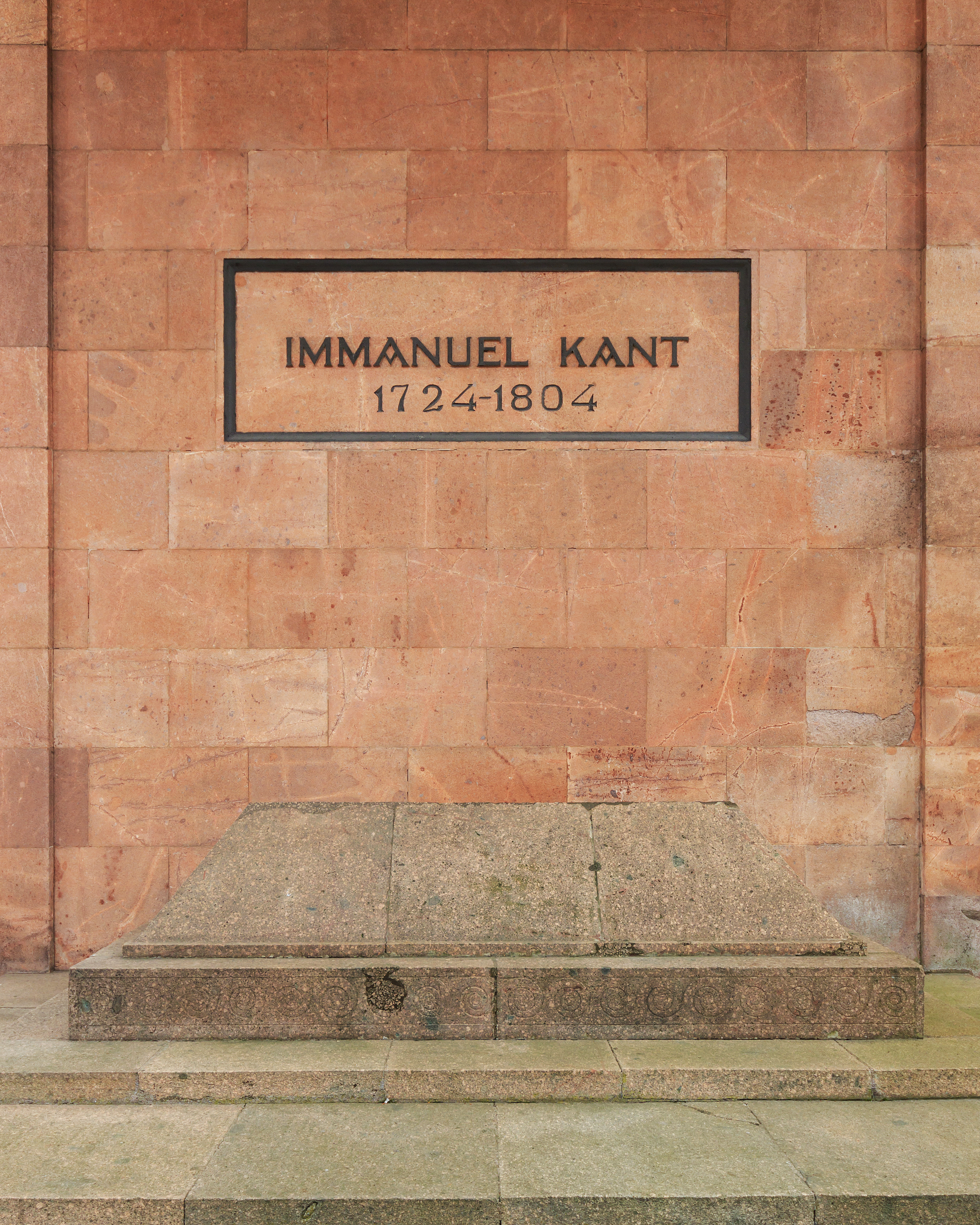
Kant Mausoleum
