= Lawsken =

Coordinates: 54°42′44″N 20°26′31″E

Lawsken was a suburban village and then quarter of Königsberg, Germany. Its territory is now part of the Tsentralny District of Kaliningrad, Russia.

== History ==
According to the 1286 charter of Altstadt, the town was granted control of a stretch of land (Hufen) from the Pregel River northward until the fields of an Old Prussian village known as Lauxken or Lauchsen.

The road Juditter Allee from Juditten became Lawsker Allee as it passed eastward through Lawsken. Lawsker Allee continued east through Ratshof and Amalienau before becoming Hufenallee in Mittelhufen. North of Lawsken was Friedrichswalde, while Holstein lay farther to the southwest along the Pregel. Because Lawsken's houses were once built only on one side of Lawsker Allee, there existed the East Prussian saying "In Lawsken werden die Fische nur auf Einer Seite gebraten" ("fish are cooked only on one side in Lawsken"). Königsberg's citizens jokingly referred to the farmers of Lawsken and Metgethen as Kartoffelhengste (potato stallions), referring to the villagers' supplying of potatoes to the city.

Storks still nested in the vicinity ca. 1900. Part of eastern Lawsken was incorporated into Königsberg on 1 April 1905, with the remainder merged into the provincial capital on 21 February 1911.
