= Mendeleyevo Microdistrict =

Microdistrict of Tsentralny, Kaliningrad, Russia

Coordinates: 54.7333°N 20.4833°E

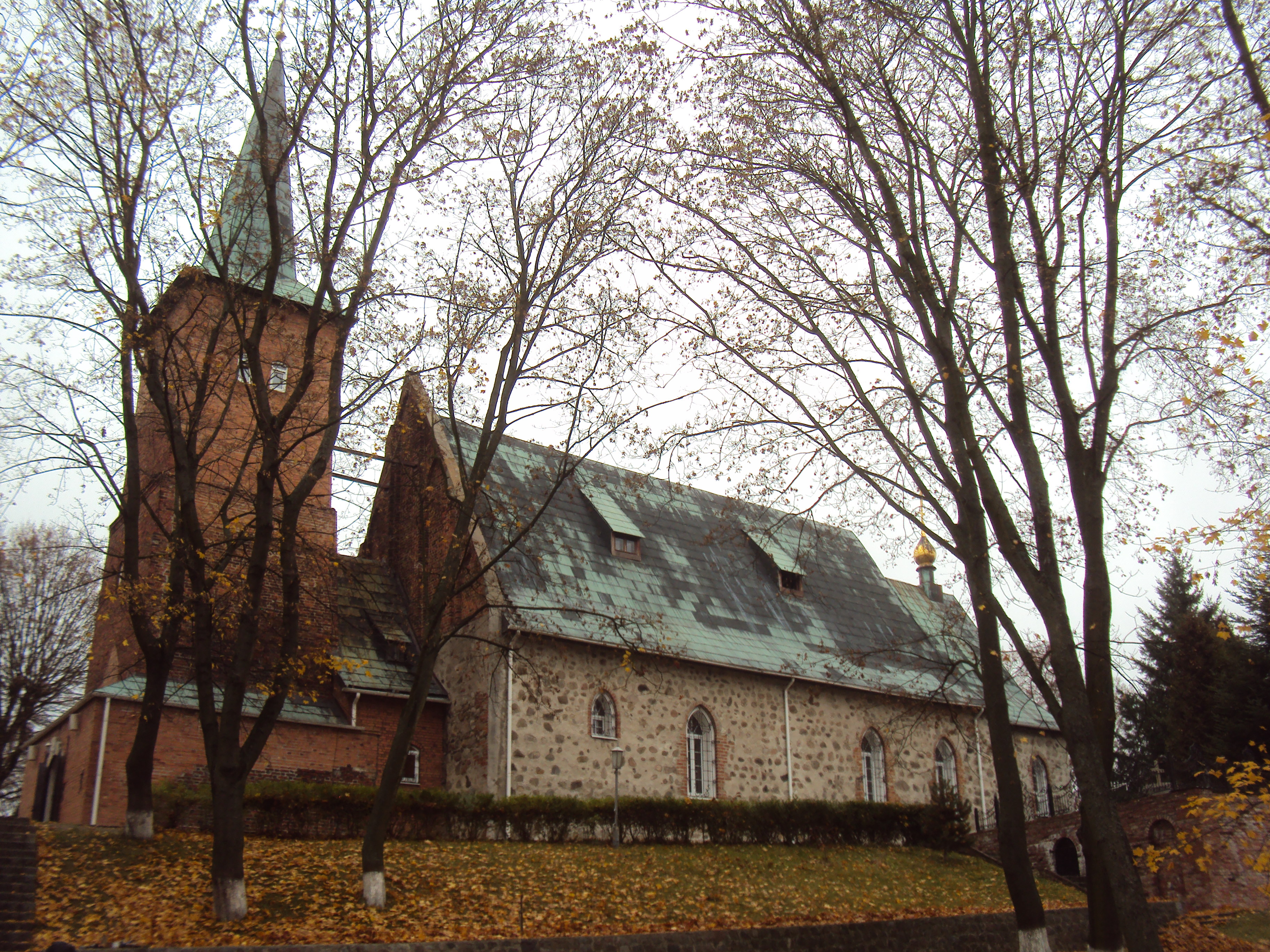
Juditten Church

Mendeleyevo (Russian: Менделеево, until 1947 German: Juditten; Polish: Judyty; Lithuanian: Judyčių) is part of the Tsentralny District in Kaliningrad, Russia. It was first a suburb of and then a quarter of Königsberg. Juditten Church was a site of pilgrimage since the Middle Ages.

== Etymology ==
The estate was first documented ca. 1287 as duas villas sic nominatas Gaudityn near Königsberg. The name was derived from the Old Prussian words gaudis (melancholy) and juodas (dark), describing the landscape. Separately, Eugen Reichel, a historian of Gottsched, attributed the name to a converted Sudovian chieftain known as Gedete who had relocated to Sambia. The site was documented in 1349 as super villam Gauditin, Gauditen and in 1402 as Judynkirchen. In 1670 it was mentioned by its modern German name, Juditten, in ducal documents.

In 1947 Juditten was renamed Mendeleyevo in Russian.

== History ==
Founded in 1288, the fortified Juditten Church was one of the oldest churches of Samland and included within the state of the Teutonic Order. The estate of Juditten developed nearby. The church was a popular Catholic pilgrimage site, especially during the 14th century rule of Grand Master Konrad von Jungingen; pilgrimages were allowed to continue after Juditten converted to Lutheranism during the Protestant Reformation. It was included within the Duchy of Prussia in 1525 and the Kingdom of Prussia in 1701. Juditten was made part of East Prussia in 1773.

In 1760 the estate was purchased by the wine merchant Balthasar Schindelmeißer, a member of Königsberg Castle's Blutgericht tavern after 1805. In 1808 his successor Johann Richter hosted King Frederick William III and Queen Louise several times. In 1814 Richter named the estate Luisenthal to honor Louise, while a fort constructed in 1855 received the name Königin Luise (Queen Louise). Juditten developed into a garden town suburb; the conservation of the parish copse was due to the efforts of the Königsberg city councillor Theodor Krohne (1846–1925). The copse was later known as the Theodor-Krohne-Wäldchen.

As a result of the Prussian administrative reorganization following the Napoleonic Wars, Juditten was included within the rural district of Königsberg (Landkreis Königsberg i. Pr.), part of Regierungsbezirk Königsberg in East Prussia, on 1 February 1818. The Amtsbezirk Juditten, administered from Ratshof, was created north and west of Königsberg in 1874. It included Juditten proper, Lawsken, Moditten, Spittelhof, Waldthal; the estates Charlottenburg, Friedrichswalde, Groß Rathshof, Klein Rathshof, Moditten; and the Juditten mill (Mühle). The fort VI Königin Luise, named in 1894, was built near Juditten as part of the new Königsberg fortifications constructed from 1872 to 1894.

At the beginning of the 20th century the village was developed into a villa suburb by the private company Villenkolonie Juditten. On 16 June 1927 Juditten was merged into the urban district of Königsberg (Stadtkreis Königsberg i. Pr).

The Juditten roads Derfflingerstraße, Lehwaldtstraße, and Frischbierweg were named after the field marshal Georg von Derfflinger, the general Hans von Lehwaldt, and the folklorist Hermann Karl Frischbier, respectively. Gottschedstraße and the town square Gottschedplatz honored native son Johann Christoph Gottsched. Peterweg honored Peter, the painter who created the frescoes in the church. Lovis-Corinth-Straße was named after the painter Lovis Corinth.

Juditten was largely unscathed during World War II. Its inhabitants either fled or were subsequently expelled westward. The village was included within the Kaliningrad Oblast of the Russian Soviet Federative Socialist Republic and renamed Mendeleyevo on 25 July 1947.

== Notable people ==
- Johann Christoph Gottsched (1700–1766), philosopher, author
