= Juditten Church =

Church in Kaliningrad, Russia

Coordinates: 54°42′57″N 20°25′29″E

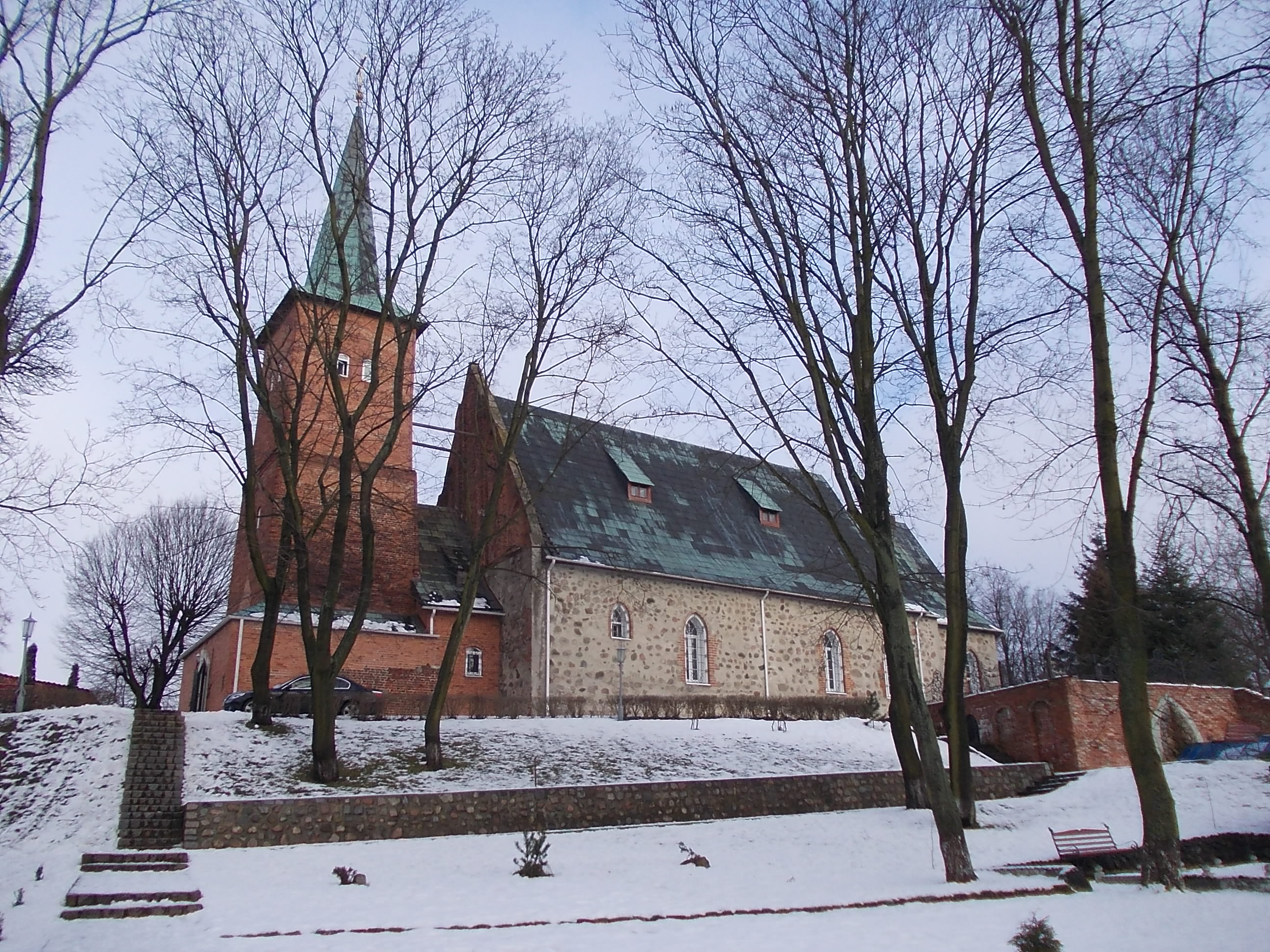
The katholikon of St. Nicholas Convent, formerly the 13th century Juditten Church

Juditten Church (German: Juditter Kirche; Russian: Юдиттен-кирха) is a Russian Orthodox church in the Mendeleyevo district of Kaliningrad, Russia. originally built as a Roman Catholic church, it later become a Prussian Union (Protestant) church. Juditten was the name of the Mendeleyevo district when it was a quarter of Königsberg, East Prussia, Germany. It is the oldest building of Kaliningrad.

One of the oldest churches of Sambia, the fortified church was built in the monastic state of the Teutonic Order between 1276 and 1294/98 or ca. 1287/88. In 1402 it was mentioned in the treasurer's book as Judynkirchen. Frescoes by the painter Peter were located in the chancel by 1394. It received a free-standing tower ca. 1400, a crucifix ca. 1520, and a weather vane in 1577. The clock tower and nave were connected by a barrel-vaulted vestibule in 1820.

Juditten became a shrine to the Virgin Mary and a medieval Christian pilgrimage site for visitors from throughout the Holy Roman Empire, especially during the era of Teutonic Order Grand Master Konrad von Jungingen (served 1393–1407). The church's frescoes depicted coats of arms (such as those of Grand Master Ulrich von Jungingen), the lives of Jesus and Mary, the Twelve Apostles, chivalric stories, and legendary creatures. Its larger-than-life Madonna and Child above a crescent moon was made out of colored wood by an unknown artist prior to 1454. According to Königsberg architect Friedrich Lahrs (1880–1964), the Madonna used to be located in Königsberg Cathedral's chapel. Its pearls were stolen from its crown by Königsberg rebels in 1454 during the Thirteen Years' War, but the Teutonic Knights replaced them in 1504 and moved the art to the pilgrimage site Juditten in 1504. The church was converted from Catholicism to Lutheranism in 1526 following the establishment of the secular Duchy of Prussia the previous year; pilgrimages were allowed to continue despite the Protestant Reformation. It also contained a cathedra from 1686, a Baroque altar, and an organ from 1840.

The church included epitaphs and portraits of field marshals Erhard Ernst von Röder and Hans von Lehwaldt by the Königsberg artist E. A. Knopke; both Röder and Lehwaldt were successively married to a daughter of Wilhelm Dietrich von Buddenbrock. Johann Christoph Gottsched was born in the church's rectory in 1700. Stanislaus Cauer was buried in the church's cemetery.

Although the church was largely undamaged by fighting during World War II, it was plundered in April 1945, when Königsberg was taken by the Soviets. Services continued until 1948. The roof and part of the walls collapsed in the 1960, and the building was neglected through the 1970s. It was reconsecrated in October 1985 as a Russian Orthodox church and eventually was restored to serve as the main church of St. Nicholas Orthodox Convent.

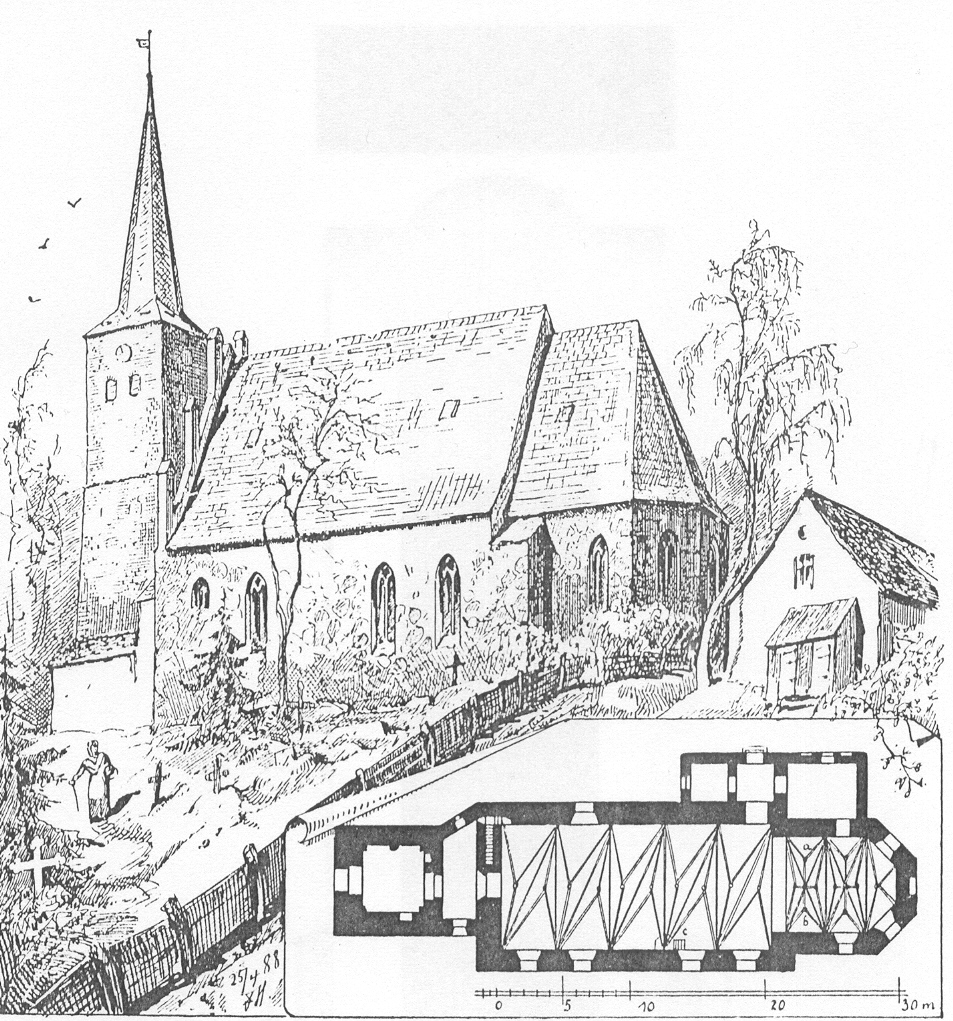
Sketch from Adolf Bötticher's Die Bau- und Kunstdenkmäler der Provinz Ostpreußen: Das Samland, 1891

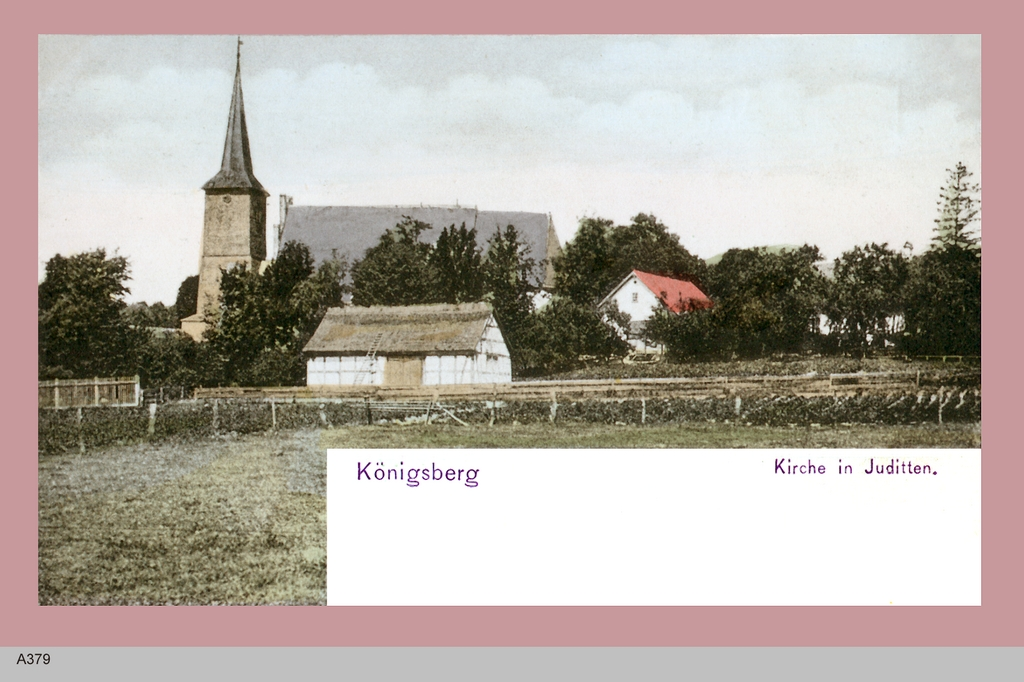
Postcard, ca. 1908

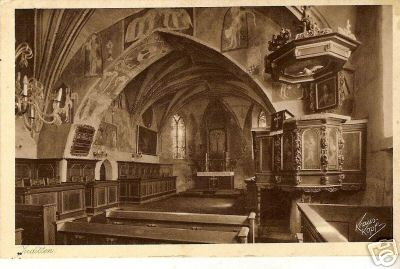
Interior of the church prior to 1945

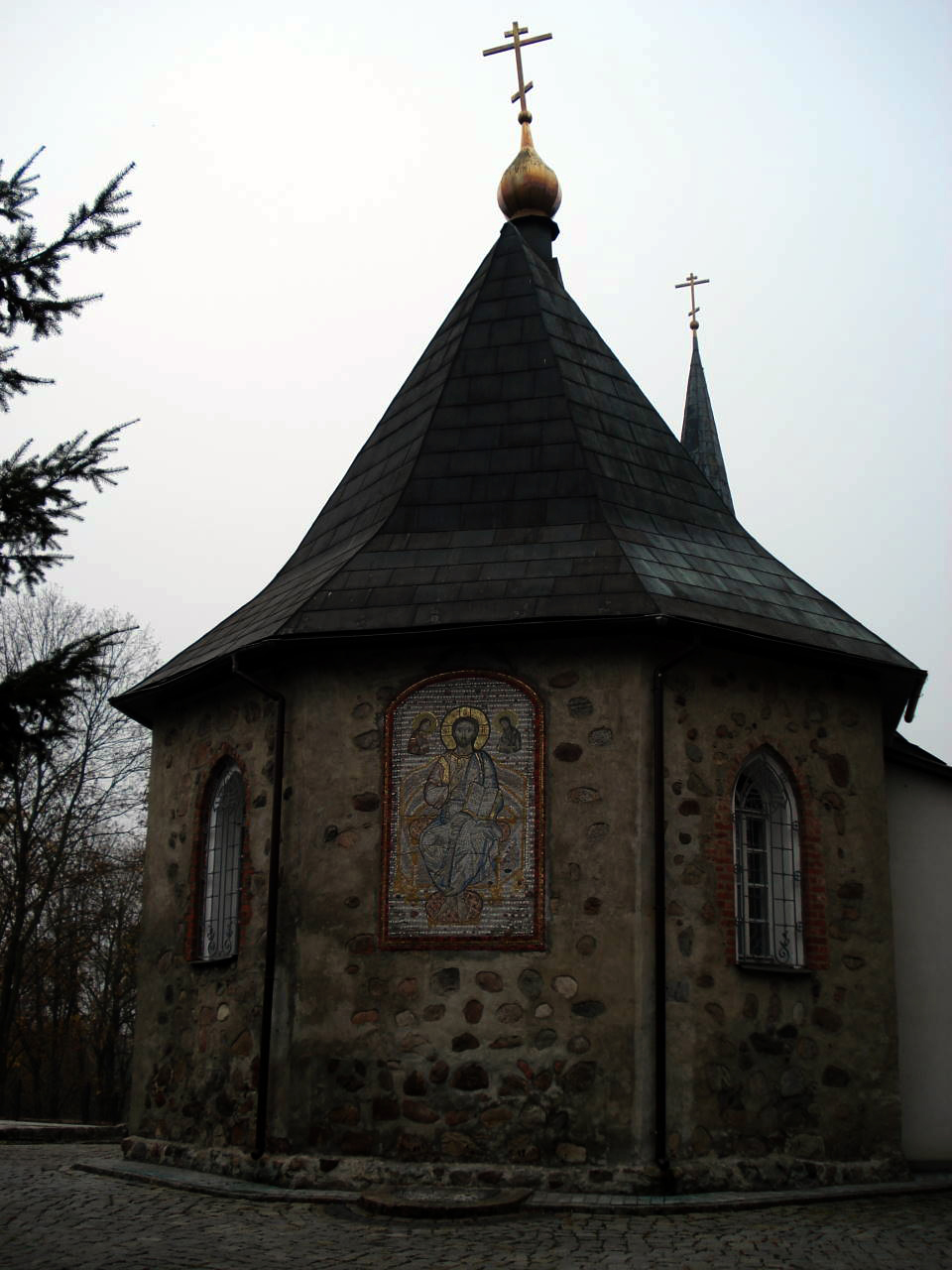
Juditten Church
