= Ratshof Church =

Church in Kaliningrad, Russia

Coordinates: 54°42′43″N 20°27′12″E

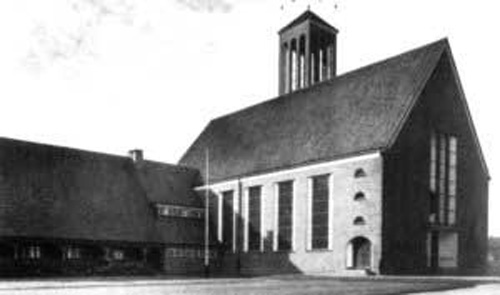
Ratshof Church, c. 1940

Ratshof Church (German: Ratshöfer Kirche) or Christuskirche (Christ Church) was a Protestant church in western Königsberg, Germany. It was the final church constructed in the city before it became Russian Kaliningrad.

The church in Ratshof was designed in 1932 by architect Kurt Frick of the Kunstakademie Königsberg. It was constructed from 1936 to 1937 and dedicated on 31 October 1937. Damaged by artillery fire during the Battle of Königsberg, the church was rebuilt after Königsberg became Kaliningrad. The Soviet Union used the redesigned building as a Palace of Culture for automotive workers. In 2010 it was transferred to the Russian Orthodox Church.
