= Barciany =

- Village
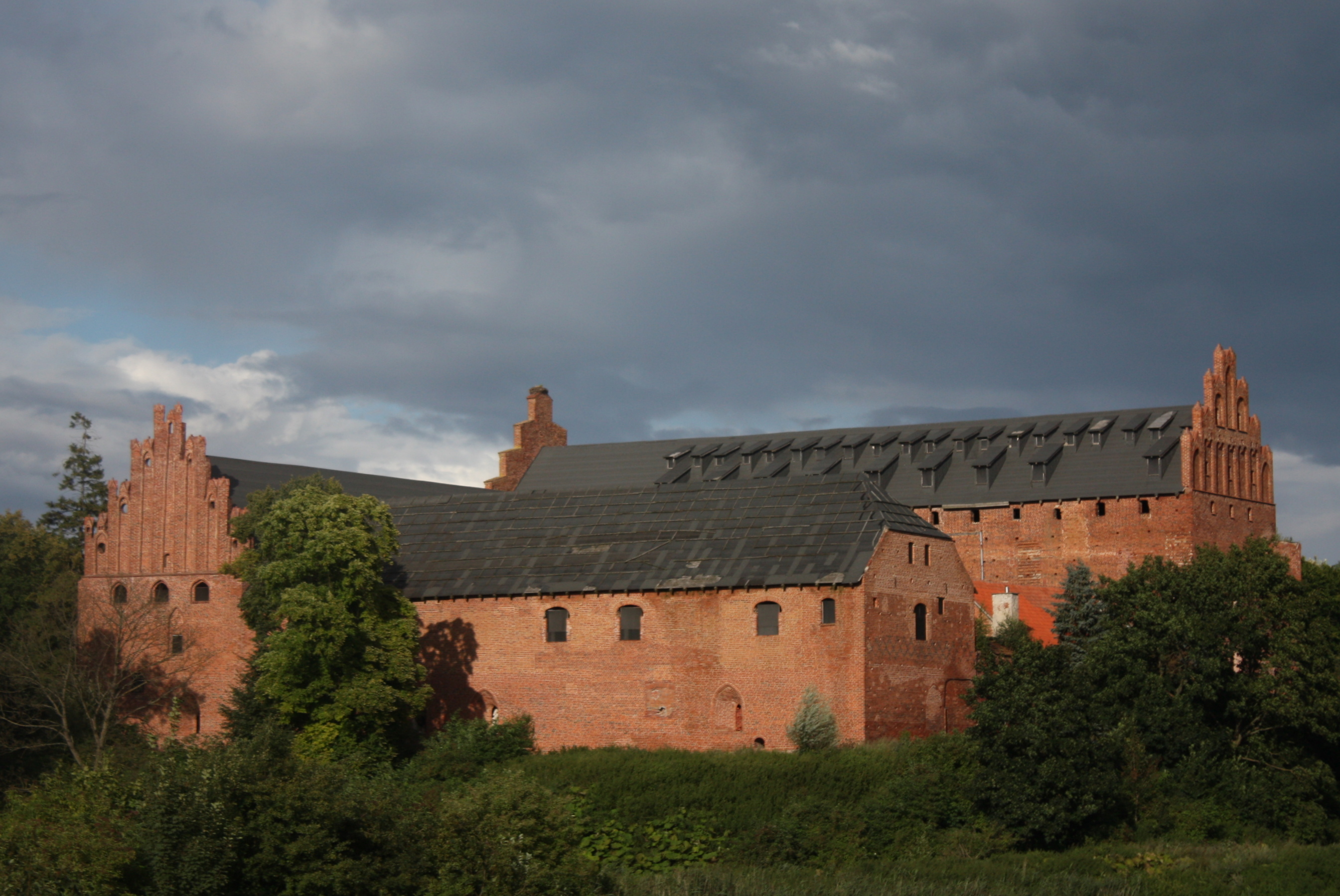
- Barciany Castle

- Coat of arms

- Location within Poland
- Coordinates: 54°13′N 21°21′E
- Country: Poland
- Voivodeship: Warmian-Masurian
- County: Kętrzyn
- Gmina: Barciany
- Elevation: 68 m (223 ft)

Population
  - Total: 1,100
- Time zone: UTC+1 (CET)
  - Summer (DST): UTC+2 (CEST)
- Vehicle registration: NKE
- Website: http://www.barciany.pl

Barciany (Polish: [barˈt͡ɕanɨ]; German: Barten, Lithuanian: Barčianiai) is a village in Kętrzyn County, Warmian-Masurian Voivodeship, in northern Poland, close to the border with the Kaliningrad Oblast of Russia. It is the seat of the gmina (administrative district) called Gmina Barciany.

== History ==
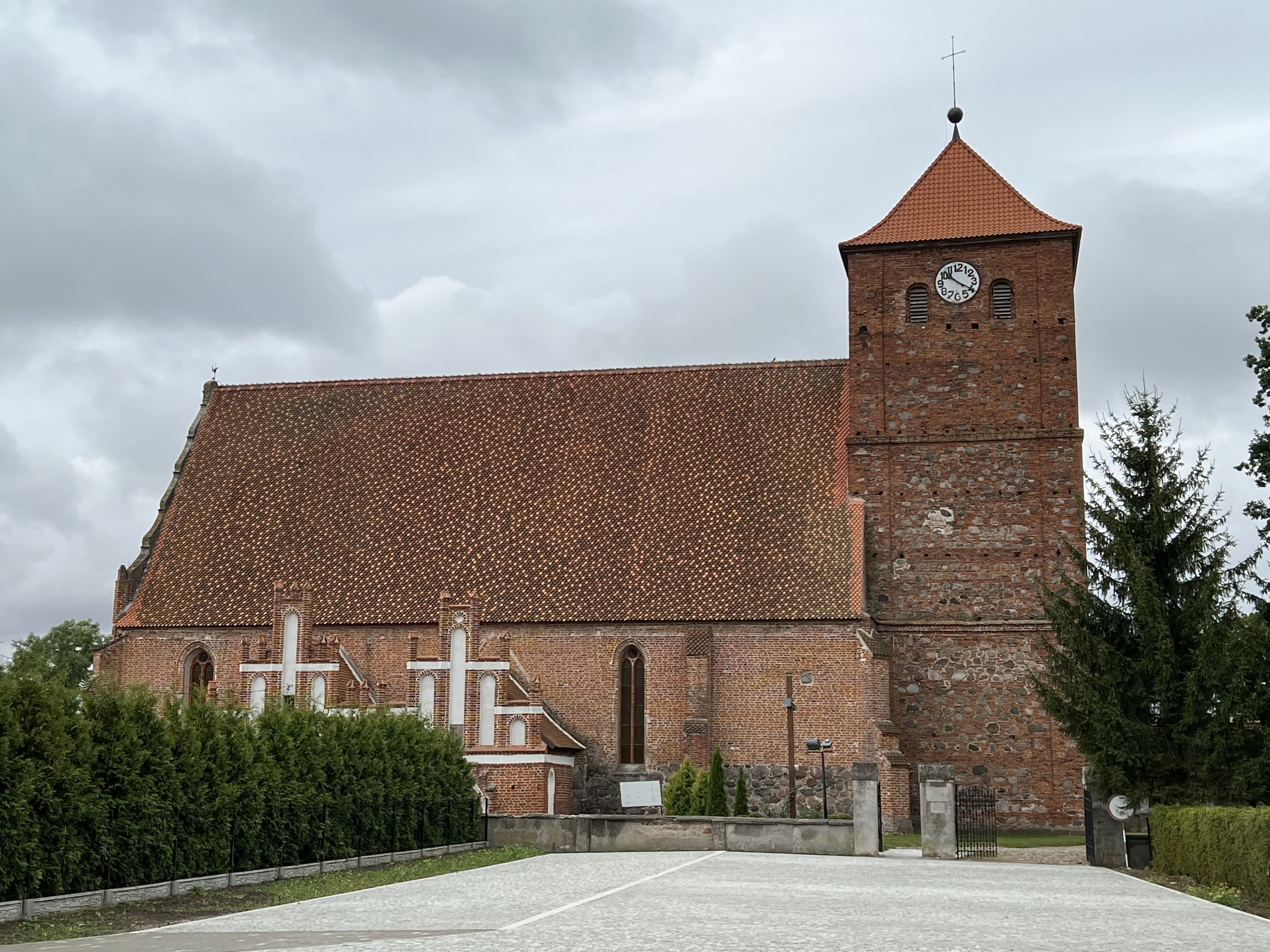
Gothic Church of the Immaculate Heart of Mary

In the Middle Ages, it was the main stronghold of the Bartians tribe, and was named after them. It was invaded and annexed by the Teutonic Knights. The castle was erected in 1325, but stone was not used until 1377. In 1454, King Casimir IV Jagiellon incorporated the region to the Kingdom of Poland upon the request of the anti-Teutonic Prussian Confederation. After the subsequent Thirteen Years' War (1454–1466), it became a part of Poland as a fief held by the Teutonic Knights. It was granted town rights based on Chełmno law in 1628.

From the 18th century, the town was part of the Kingdom of Prussia, and from 1871 also of Germany. Ten annual fairs were held in the town in the late 19th century. After Germany's defeat in World War II in 1945, the town became again part of Poland under the terms of the Potsdam Agreement. Initially it formed part of the Masurian District, and from 1946 to 1998 it was located in the Olsztyn Voivodeship.

== Notable people ==
- Hermann Gemmel (1813–1868), German architect, painter, and art teacher at the Kunstakademie Königsberg.
