= Rothenstein =

Rothenstein may refer to:

== People ==
Rothenstein is a surname. Notable people with the surname include:

- Conrad Zöllner von Rothenstein (1325–1390), Grand Master of the Teutonic Order from 1382 to 1390.
- Sir William Rothenstein (1872–1945), English painter, printmaker, draughtsman, lecturer, and writer on art (father of John and Michael below)
- Sir John Rothenstein (1901–1992), English arts administrator, art historia, and former director of the Tate
- Michael Rothenstein (1908–1993), English printmaker, painter and art teacher

== Places ==
- Rothenstein, Germany, a municipality in Thuringia, population 1335 in 2011.
- Rothenstein (Königsberg), a quarter of former Königsberg, East Prussia.
