= Nevskoye Microdistrict =

Part of Kaliningrad, Russia

Nevskoye (Russian: Невское) is a residential area in Leningradsky District of Kaliningrad, Russia. It was formerly known by its German language names Kummerau and Cummerau as first a suburb of and then a quarter of Königsberg, Germany, located northeast of the city center.

== History ==
Kummerau was founded in 1336 by the Bishopric of Samland as a German village; all surrounding villages at the time were inhabited by Old Prussians. In the 18th century Kummerau was administered from Kalthof.

By the 20th century Kummerau was connected to Rothenstein to the northwest by Rothensteiner Straße and connected to Devau to the south by Kummerauer Straße. The village was incorporated into the city of Königsberg in 1927. Housing in Kummerau increased in the 1930s during the Nazi era.

Königsberg was transferred to Soviet control in 1945 after World War II. Königsberg was subsequently renamed to Kaliningrad and Kummerau to Nevskoye, after Alexander Nevsky.
