= Friedrichswalde (Königsberg) =

Friedrichswalde (German pronunciation: [fʁiːdʁɪçsˈvaldə]) was a suburban estate and then quarter of western Königsberg, Germany. Its territory is now part of the Tsentralny District of Kaliningrad, Russia.

== History ==
Friedrichswalde developed from a Jagdschloss, a hunting lodge built in the 1690s after a visit by Frederick III in 1690. Other lodges commissioned by Frederick at the same time were Friedrichshof and Friedrichsberg. It later came into the possession of the Charisius family; their tomb was decorated by Stanislaus Cauer. The estate was incorporated into the city of Königsberg on 16 June 1927.

Friedrichswalde was bordered by Juditten to the southwest, Lawsken to the south, Ratshof to the southeast, and Amalienau to the east.
