= Kopskiekelwein =

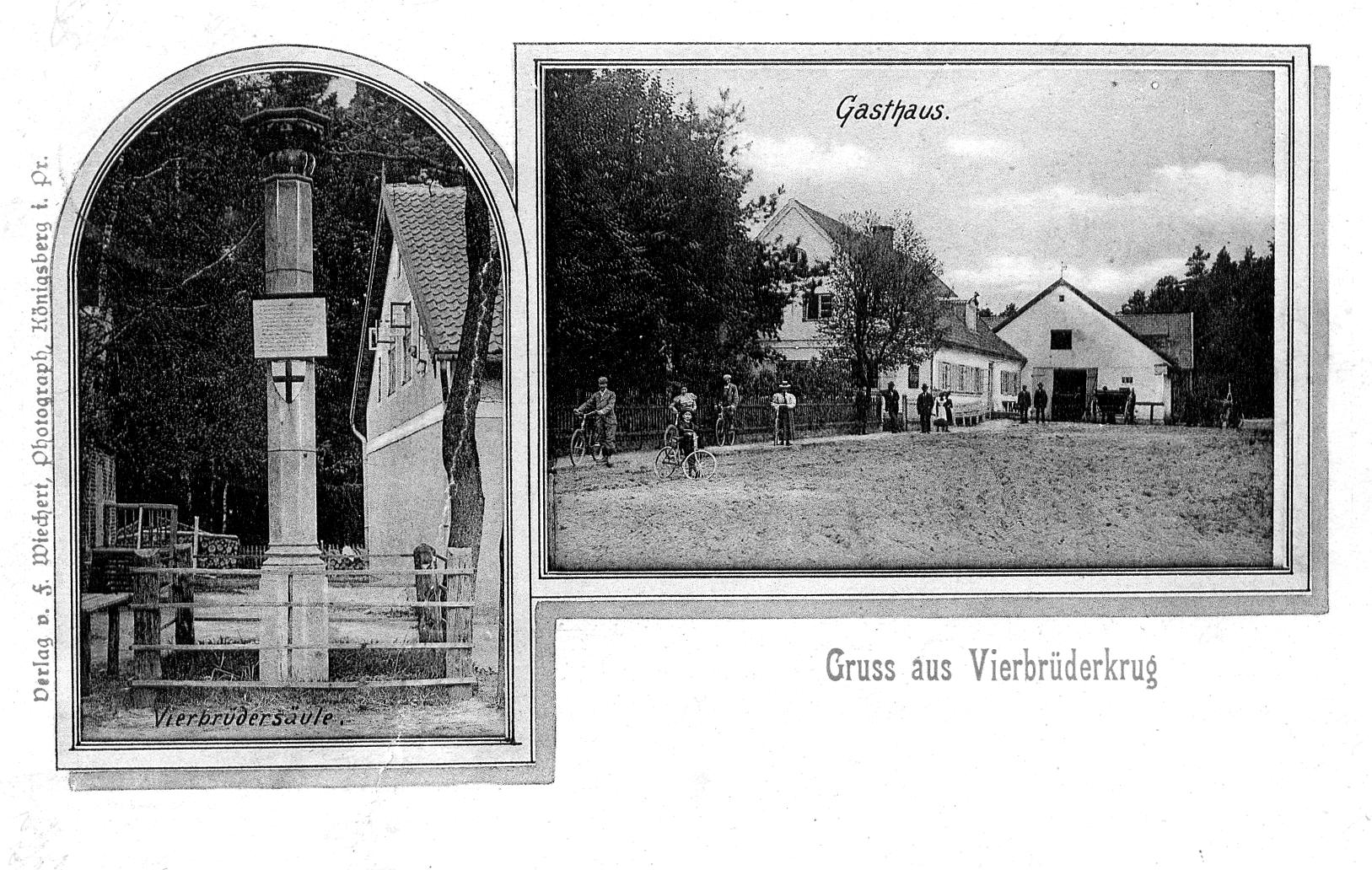
The Four Brothers Inn (Vierbrüderkrug) in Metgethen, one of two places where travellers could enjoy kopskiekelwein.

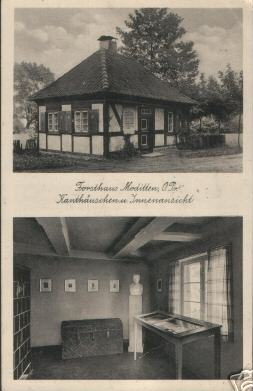
The Immanuel Kant House at the Forester's Lodge in Moditten. The tavern was well known for its specialty kopskiekelwein.

Kopskiekelwein was a currant wine produced in the former German province of East Prussia.

The wine was made from either blackcurrants or redcurrants, and was usually fermented with Burgundy yeast. Kopskiekelwein took its name from the jocular saying that whoever became too fond of the drink would fall down headfirst - or kopskiekel in the old Low Prussian dialect.

Popular pubs where the wine was available included the forester's lodge in Moditten and the Four Brothers Inn (Vierbrüderkrug) in Metgethen, both located in the suburbs of Königsberg. These establishments were destroyed during World War II and no longer exist.
