= Hermann Gemmel =

German painter

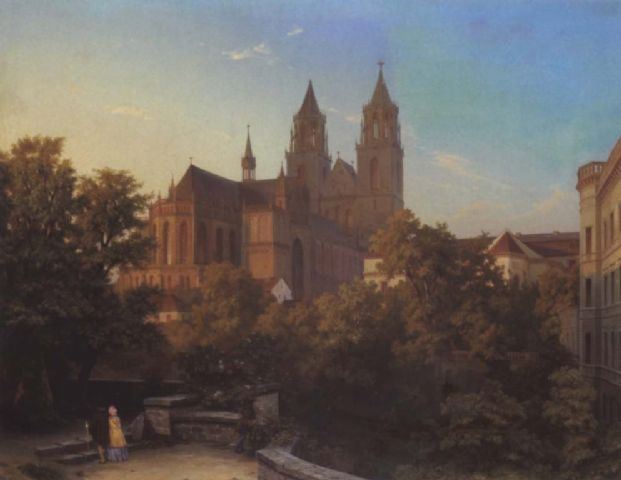
View of the Cathedral of Magdeburg, 1844

Hermann Johann Ernst Gemmel (28 November 1813 – 22 March 1868) was a German architect, painter, and art teacher at the Kunstakademie Königsberg.

Hermann Gemmel was born in Barten, East Prussia (now Barciany, Poland) in 1813. He studied painting with Karl Eduard Biermann, Wilhelm Schirmer, and Franz Krüger at the Academy of Arts, Berlin, and specialized in architecture painting, mainly sights from Germany and Italy. He became in 1855 the professor of perspective and architecture at the Kunstakademie Königsberg, and died in Königsberg in 1868.
