= Rothenstein (Königsberg) =

Coordinates: 54°44′17″N 20°31′42″E

Rothenstein (German pronunciation: [ˈʁoːtn̩ʃtaɪn]) was first a suburb of and then a quarter of northeastern Königsberg, Germany. Its territory is now part of the Leningradsky District of Kaliningrad, Russia.

Rothenstein was located northeast of the Oberteich. It was connected to Maraunenhof by the road Cranzer Allee and to Kummerau by Rothensteiner Straße.

A retirement and nursing home opened in Rothenstein in 1914. A munitions explosion at Rothenstein's munitions factory caused the death of 200 workers on 10 April 1920; Friedrich Lahrs and Stanislaus Cauer designed a memorial in the nearby Gemeindefriedhof cemetery to honor the victims. The architect Kurt Frick developed the housing development Siedlung Rothenstein after his return to Königsberg in 1921. Rothenstein was incorporated into the city of Königsberg by 1927.

After the Soviet capture of Königsberg during World War II, the NKVD established an internment camp in Rothenstein. Michael Wieck was among the incarcerated.
