= Hugo Knorr =

German painter

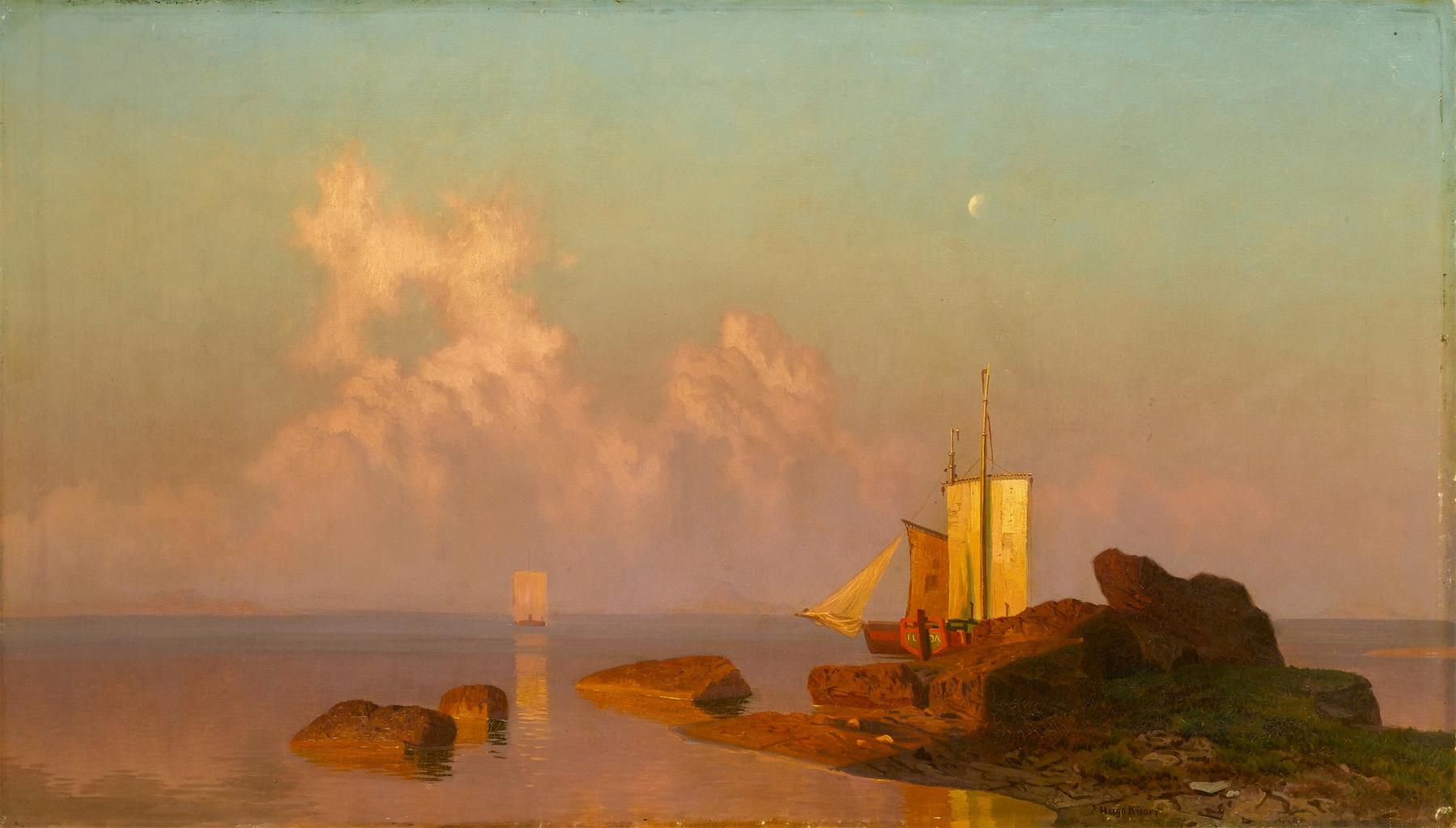
Knorr's Sunset at Königsberg

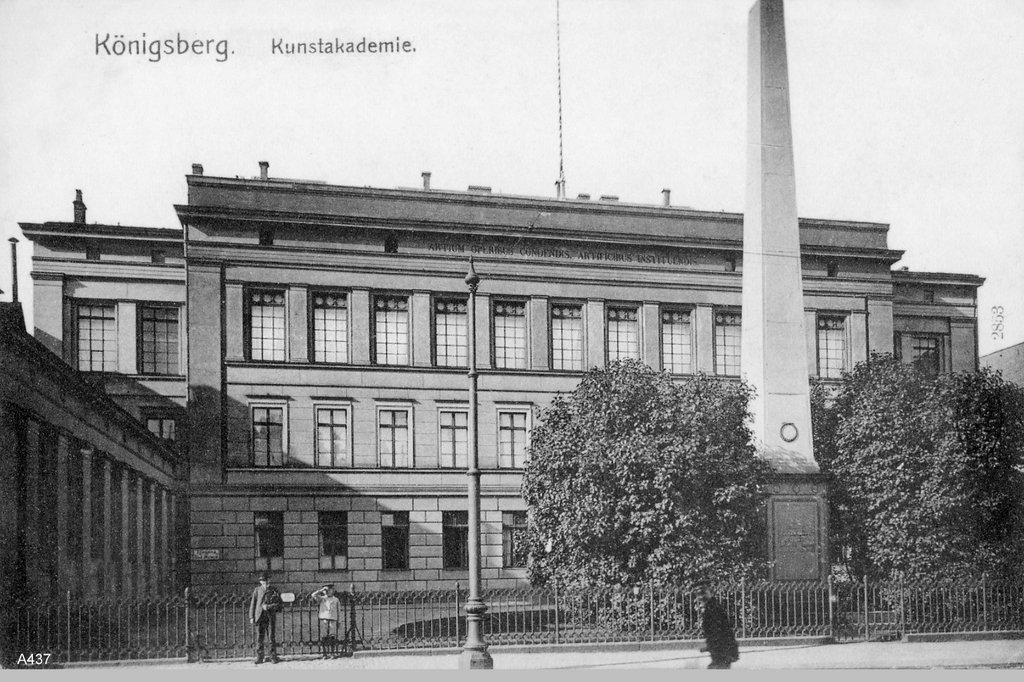
The Königsberg Academy of Art

Hugo Knorr (17 November 1834 – 29 September 1904) was a Prussian and German painter and teacher of art, specializing in landscape and marine art.

== Life ==
Knorr was born at Königsberg in East Prussia. In 1852, when he was almost eighteen, he entered the Königsberg Academy of Art, where he chiefly studied landscape painting. Later, his master was the painter August Behrendsen.

In 1875 Knorr was appointed as a professor of art at the Karlsruhe Institute of Technology. He died at Karlsruhe in 1904.

== Work ==
Many of Knorr's oil paintings are landscapes of the Norwegian coast, shown in all its seasons and moods. He is also known for drawings in chalk and charcoal to illustrate works of literature, including Esaias Tegnér's Frithjofssage (1867) and Carl Weitbrecht's Was der Mond bescheint (1872).
