= Barciany Castle =

Coordinates: 54.2138°N 21.3481°E

- Ordensburg Barten
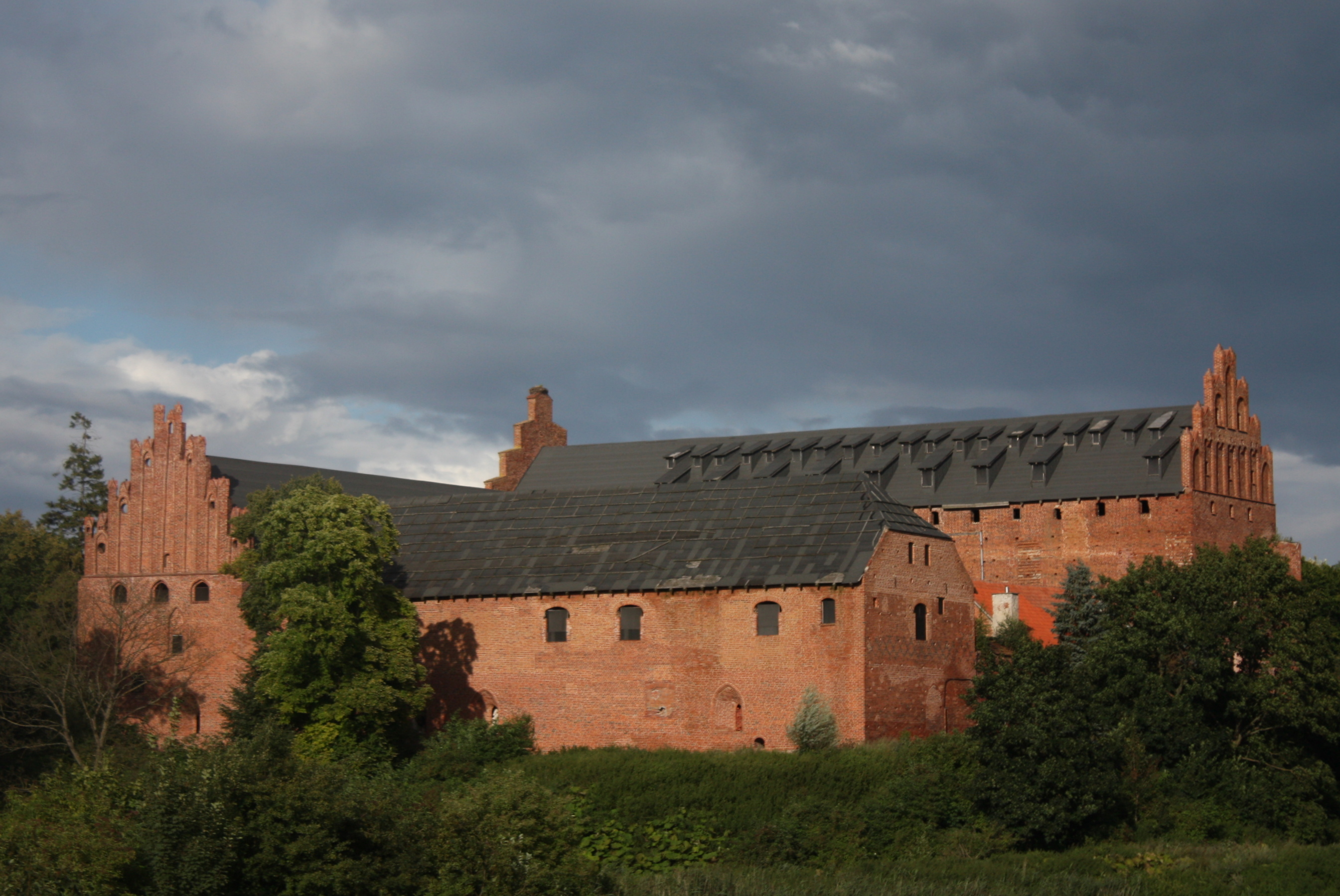

General information
- Architectural style: Brick Gothic
- Location: Poland
- Town or city: Barciany, Kętrzyn County
- Construction started: 13th century

Barciany Castle (German: Ordensburg Barten), is a 14th-century Teutonic Castle in Barciany village in Kętrzyn County, Warmian-Masurian Voivodeship, in northern Poland.

== History ==
Barciany Castle was first mentioned in 1325 as a wooden structure. In the late 14th century the Grand Master of the Teutonic Order Winrich von Kniprode decided to place the seat of a Komtur. The construction of a brick castle started in 1377, ending around 1400, with later additions in the 15th century.

The castle remained under the rule of the Order until the moment of its secularization, when it became the seat of the steward of a local estate. The castle was a private property from the 19th century until 1945. After World War II it was turned into the offices and storerooms of a local PGR (State Agricultural Farm).

== See also ==
- Castles in Poland
