= Kunstakademie Königsberg =

Former art school in Königsberg, Germany

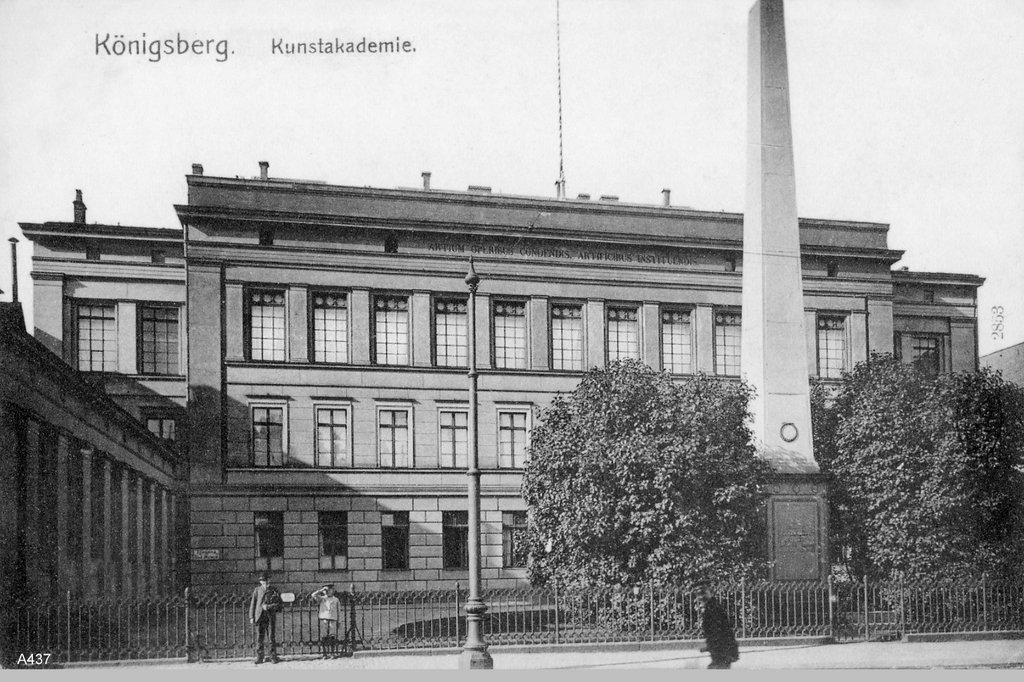
The Kunstakademie at its original Königstraße location

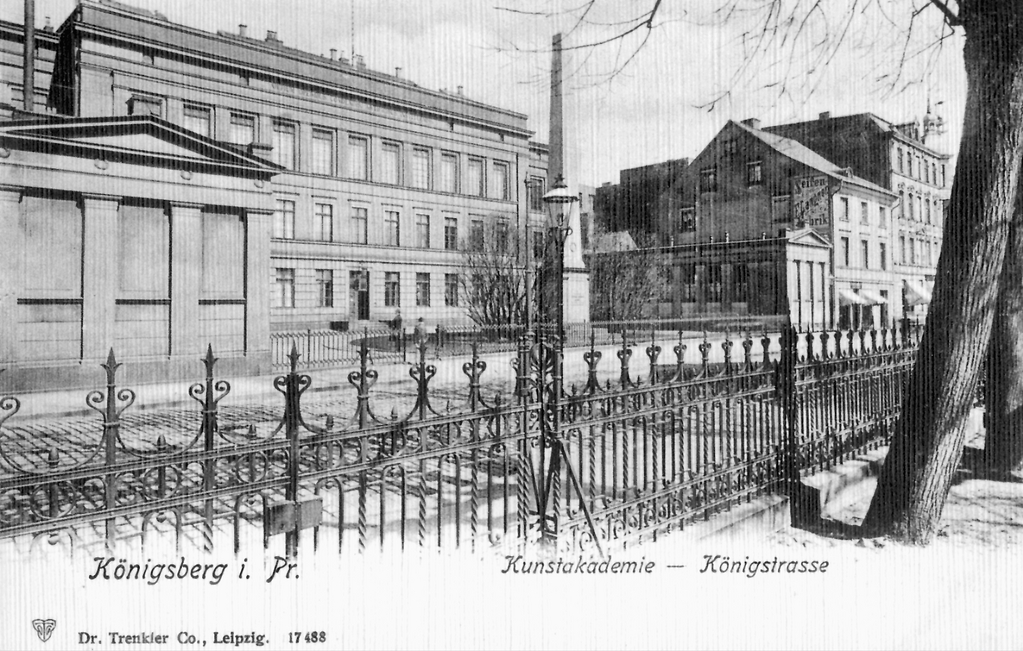
The Kunstakademie at its original Königstraße location

The Kunstakademie Königsberg was a visual arts school in Königsberg, Germany. It focused on genre works, landscape art, and marine art, especially of East Prussia, as well as sculpture and architecture. It regularly consisted of 8 teachers and 40–50 students.

== History ==
The Kunst- und Zeichenschule (art and drawing school), or Kunstschule (art school), was founded at Königsberg Castle in 1790. In 1833 the Governor of Prussia, Theodor von Schön, desired to open a public hall to exhibit works for the city's municipal art gallery, university, and art school. On 10 March 1838 King Frederick William III of Prussia granted the Kleiner Jägerhof palace on Königstraße in eastern Königsberg for this purpose. The Kleiner Jägerhof was dismantled and a new structure was built from 1838 to 1841 in the classical style.

Schön suggested the creation of an art academy in the new building to Culture Minister Johann von Eichhorn on 14 May 1841. Supported by Professor Ernst August Hagen, Schön then petitioned Frederick William III in October 1841, with King Frederick William IV granting his approval in a cabinet order on 3 May 1842. The new art academy opened in 1845 under the direction of historical painter Ludwig Rosenfelder. Its first students were taught by the architect and art historian Hermann Gemmel and the painter August Behrendsen.

Planning for a new building in the western quarter of Ratshof began in 1910. This new Ratshöfer Akademie, designed by architectural professor Friedrich Lahrs, opened in 1916 and was completed in 1919. Costing 920,000 Mark, the new academy included the main building with the director's office and custodial office (487,000 Mark), buildings for sculptors, painters, and graphic artists (286,000 Mark), and auxiliary buildings (100,000 Mark). The interior was decorated at a cost of 47,000 Mark. Ornamental sculptures were designed by Stanislaus Cauer. Many of the professors lived near the main building or along the western side of Dürerstraße near Amalienau. The Kunstschule remained at the previous Königstraße building.

In 1917 during World War I, the Kunstakademie held an exhibition in occupied Vilnius.

Enrollment at the academy declined during World War II as students were conscripted into military service. It was closed at the beginning of 1945 during the East Prussian Offensive. The building is now used as a school in Kaliningrad, Russia.

== Directors ==
- Ludwig Rosenfelder, 1845–80
- Carl Steffeck, 1880–90
- Maximilian Schmidt, deputy director from 1874 to 1880, then director from 1890 to 1900
- Ludwig Dettmann, 1900–1916
- Georg Knorr, deputy director from 1 October 1900 – 9 April 1901
- Alfred von Brühl, 1 October 1916 – 23 June 1921
- Wilhelm Thiele, 23 June 1921 – 1925
- Hermann Nollau, 1925–33
- Kurt Frick, 1933–45
- Franz Marten, deputy director from 1936

== Teachers ==
- August Behrendsen
- Stanislaus Cauer
- Friedrich Lahrs
- Emil Neide
- Alfred Partikel
- Friedrich Reusch
- Karl Storch the Elder
- Heinrich Wolff

== Students ==
- Fritz Ascher (1893-1970)
- Eduard Bischoff (1890-1974)
- Lovis Corinth (1858-1925)
- Pranas Domšaitis (Franz Domscheit) (1880-1965)
- Hugo Knorr (1834–1904)
- Käthe Kollwitz (1867–1945)
- Lothar Malskat
- Lina von Perbandt (1836–1884)
- Waldemar Philippi
