= Carl Steffeck =

German painter and graphic artist (1818–1890)

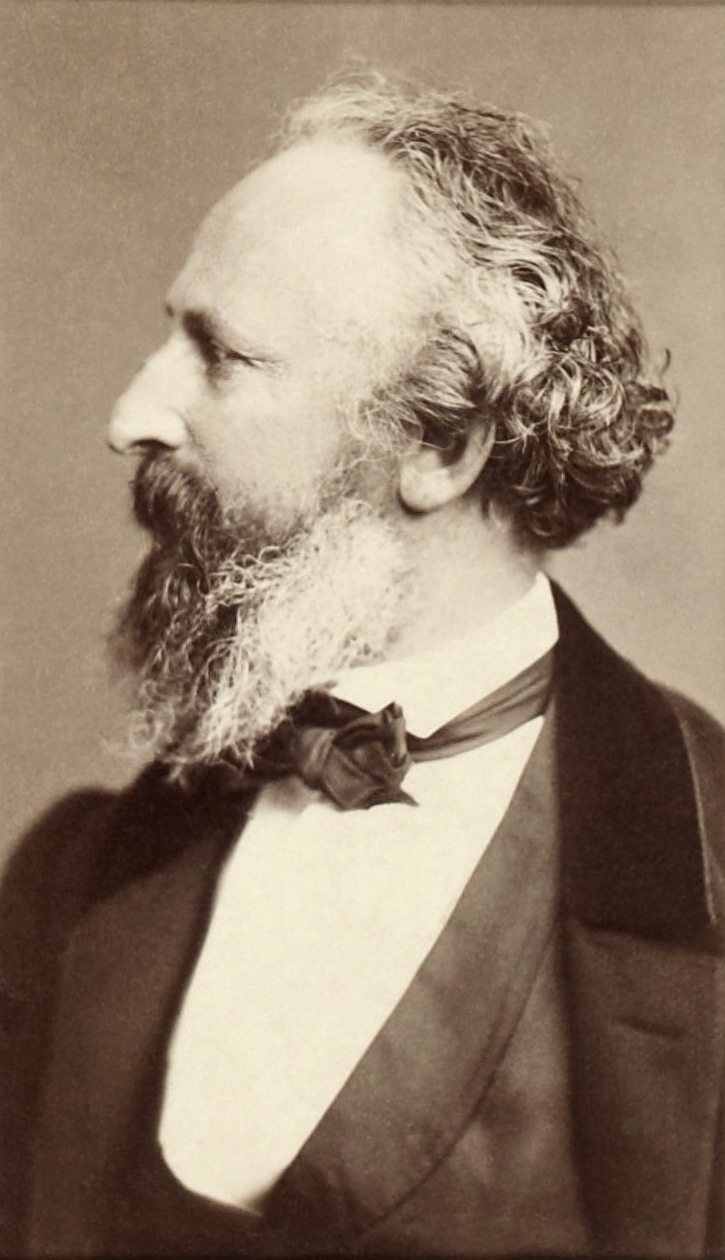
Steffeck, c. 1880

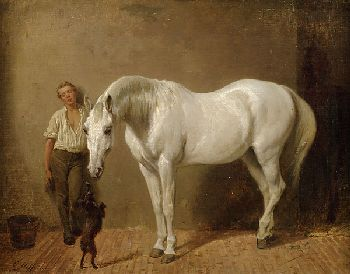
White Horse, Boy and Dog (date unknown)

Carl Constantin Heinrich Steffeck (4 April 1818 – 11 July 1890) was a German painter and graphic artist. He was especially well known for his paintings of horses and dogs.

== Life ==
He was the son of a "gentleman of independent means" who was interested in art. While he was still in the Gymnasium he sat in on classes at the Prussian Academy of Arts. In 1837, he entered the master class of horse painter Franz Krüger and later worked in the studios of Carl Joseph Begas. He went to Paris in 1839, where he spent two months studying with Paul Delaroche and was influenced by the work of Horace Vernet. From 1840 to 1842, he lived in Italy.

When he returned, he devoted himself primarily to paintings of hunters and animals. Over time, he concentrated more on horses; at rest, exercising, engaging in sports etc., but he continued to paint portraits of all sizes as well as historical paintings, lithographs, etchings, and even some small bronze animal sculptures. His student, Max Liebermann recalled how Steffeck would produce small horse-and-rider portraits, which he sold for six Friedrichsdor each and were taken home by customers while they were still wet.

From the early 1850s, he was increasingly devoted to teaching. In 1859, he became a Professor at the Prussian Academy and, in 1880, was appointed Director of the Kunstakademie Königsberg. Among his best-known non-animal works are The Execution of Robert Blum in Brigittenau and a cycle of scenes from Prussian history for the Wilhelms-Gymnasium in Königsberg.

He died suddenly, of a stroke, and is buried at the Französischer Friedhof (French Cemetery) in Berlin.
