= Ludwig Rosenfelder =

German painter

Ludwig Rosenfelder (July 18, 1813, in Breslau – April 18, 1881, in Königsberg) was a German painter and philosopher. He studied at Wilhelm Hensel and Wilhelm Ternite at Prussian Academy of Arts and specialized in religious and historical paintings.

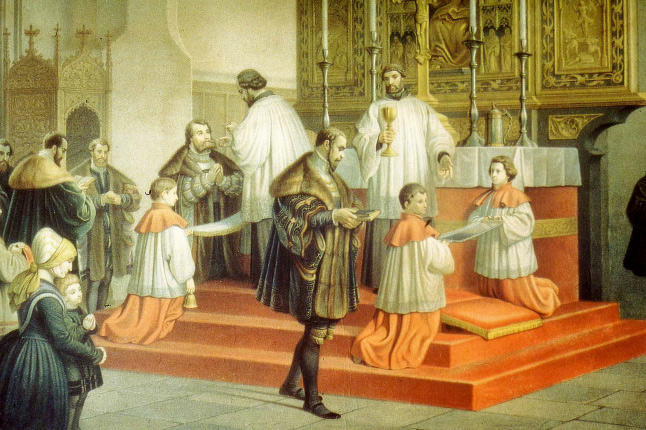
Albert, Duke of Prussia
