= Pregolsky Microdistrict =

Residential area in Kaliningrad, Russia

Coordinates: 54°41′36″N 20°23′42″E

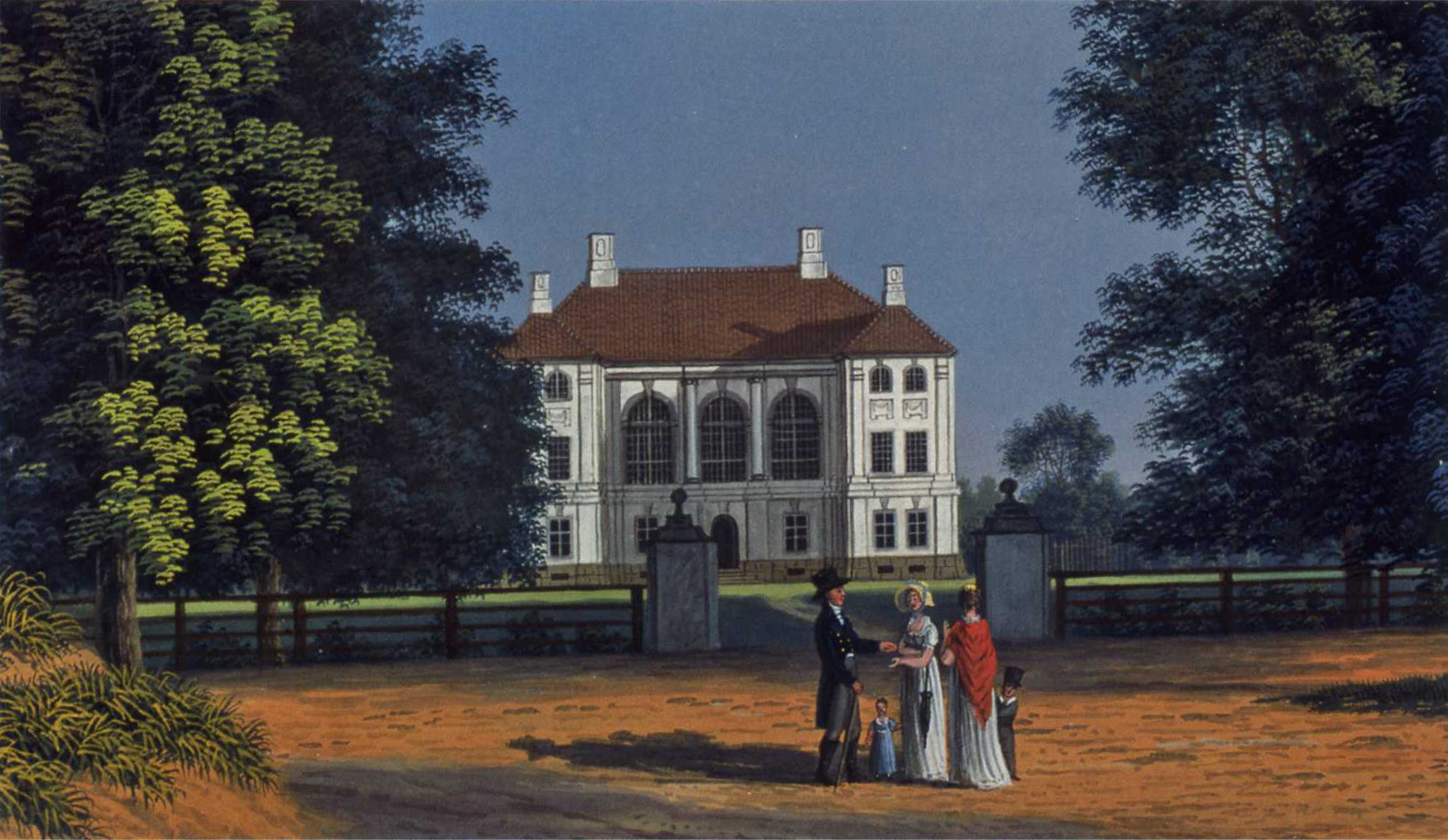
Schloss Holstein, c. 1830

Pregolsky (Russian: Прегольский) is a residential area within Tsentralny City District of Kaliningrad, Kaliningrad Oblast, Russia.

Prior to World War II, it was known by its German language name Holstein (archaic Hollstein) as first a suburban estate and then a quarter of Königsberg, Germany, located west of the city center.

== History ==
Located 7 kilometers (4.3 mi) from medieval Königsberg on the northern shore of the Pregel near where the river flowed into the Vistula Lagoon, the Old Prussian village of Kasewalx was first documented in 1405. Other early names included Kasewolx, Kasewalk, and Kesewalk. The name was of Old Prussian origin and referred to a brook or stream.

In 1508, ten farmers lived in the village, then known as Kasebalk and Kasebalg. Johann Schimmelpfennig (1604-1669), a Königsberg Councillor and vice-mayor of Kneiphof, possessed the village and surrounding region in 1650. His widow later sold the land to Elector Frederick III. East of the village was the inn Langerfeldkrug.

From 1693 to 1697, Frederick tasked Georg Heinrich Kranichfeld with building the hunting palace Friedrichshof near the Langerfeldkrug inn according to a design by Johann Arnold Nering. Tiles from the dismantled castle of Fischhausen were used in its construction. Frederick, king as of 1701, used his new mansion for elk hunts in the Kaporner Heath. Other nearby mansions commissioned at the same time were Friedrichsberg and Friedrichswalde, estates which existed until 1945.

King Frederick William I of Prussia granted Friedrichshof and Kasebalk to his cousin, Frederick William II, Duke of Schleswig-Holstein-Sonderburg-Beck, on 15 May 1719. Holstein-Beck subsequently renamed Friedrichshof to Holstein and had it expanded into the shape of an "H" to honor Saint Hubert. It was one of the finest examples of Baroque architecture in East Prussia, with high arched windows reminiscent of Charlottenburg Palace.

Holstein-Beck's descendants sold the manor into private hands in 1765. The Jewish merchant David Meyer Friedländer acquired Holstein from a bankrupt Major von Below in 1812 for 70,000 Thaler. Some refugees from the 1830 November Uprising of Poles against the Russian Empire who had entered East Prussia were temporarily interned in Holstein. In 1835 it was acquired by the Magnus family. By 1863 the village Kasebalk had been renamed Klein Holstein ("Lesser Holstein"), while the manor and estate were known as Groß Holstein ("Greater Holstein"). A schnapps distilled in Groß Holstein, euphemistically named Pregelgestank after the smell of the Pregel, was especially popular with oarsmen. Sledding also became popular in the vicinity of scenic Holstein. The fort VII Herzog von Holstein, named in 1894, was built near Holstein as part of the new Königsberg fortifications constructed from 1872 to 1894.

Holstein and its environs were incorporated into the city of Königsberg in 1927 and 1928. The city became Russian Kaliningrad after World War II; Holstein was renamed Pregolskiy after the Pregolya (Pregel) River. The manor is now used as a research institute.

== Sources ==
- Albinus, Robert (1985). Lexikon der Stadt Königsberg Pr. und Umgebung (in German). Leer: Verlag Gerhard Rautenberg. p. 371. ISBN 3-7921-0320-6.
- Gause, Fritz (1965). Die Geschichte der Stadt Königsberg. Band I: Von der Gründung der Stadt bis zum letzten Kurfürsten (in German). Köln: Böhlau Verlag. p. 571.
- Gause, Fritz (1968). Die Geschichte der Stadt Königsberg. Band II: Von der Königskrönung bis zum Ausbruch des Ersten Weltkriegs (in German). Köln: Böhlau Verlag. p. 761.
- Gerullis, Georg (1922). Die altpreußischen Ortsnamen gesammelt und sprachlich behandelt (in German). Berlin und Leipzig: Vereinigung wissenschaftlicher Verleger. p. 286.
- Hedicke, Otto (1891). Geschichte des Infanterie-Regiments Herzog von Holstein (Holsteinsches) Nr. 85 (in German). Berlin: Ernst Siegfried Mittler und Sohn. p. 53.
- Hermanowski, Georg (1996). Ostpreußen: Wegweiser durch ein unvergessenes Land (in German). Augsburg: Bechtermünz Verlag. p. 344. ISBN 3-86047-182-1.
- Lullies, Hans (1891). Landeskunde von Ost- und Westpreussen (in German). Breslau. p. 55.
- Mühlpfordt, Herbert Meinhard (1972). Königsberg von A bis Z (in German). München: Aufstieg-Verlag. p. 168. ISBN 3-7612-0092-7.
