= Stanislaus Cauer =

German sculptor (1867–1943)

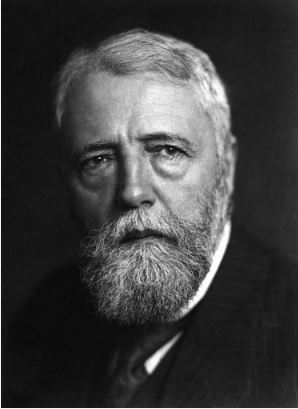
Stanislaus Cauer (c.1930)

Stanislaus Cauer (18 October 1867 – 8 March 1943) was a German sculptor, medallist and art teacher. He is best known for his monument to Friedrich Schiller.

== Life and work ==
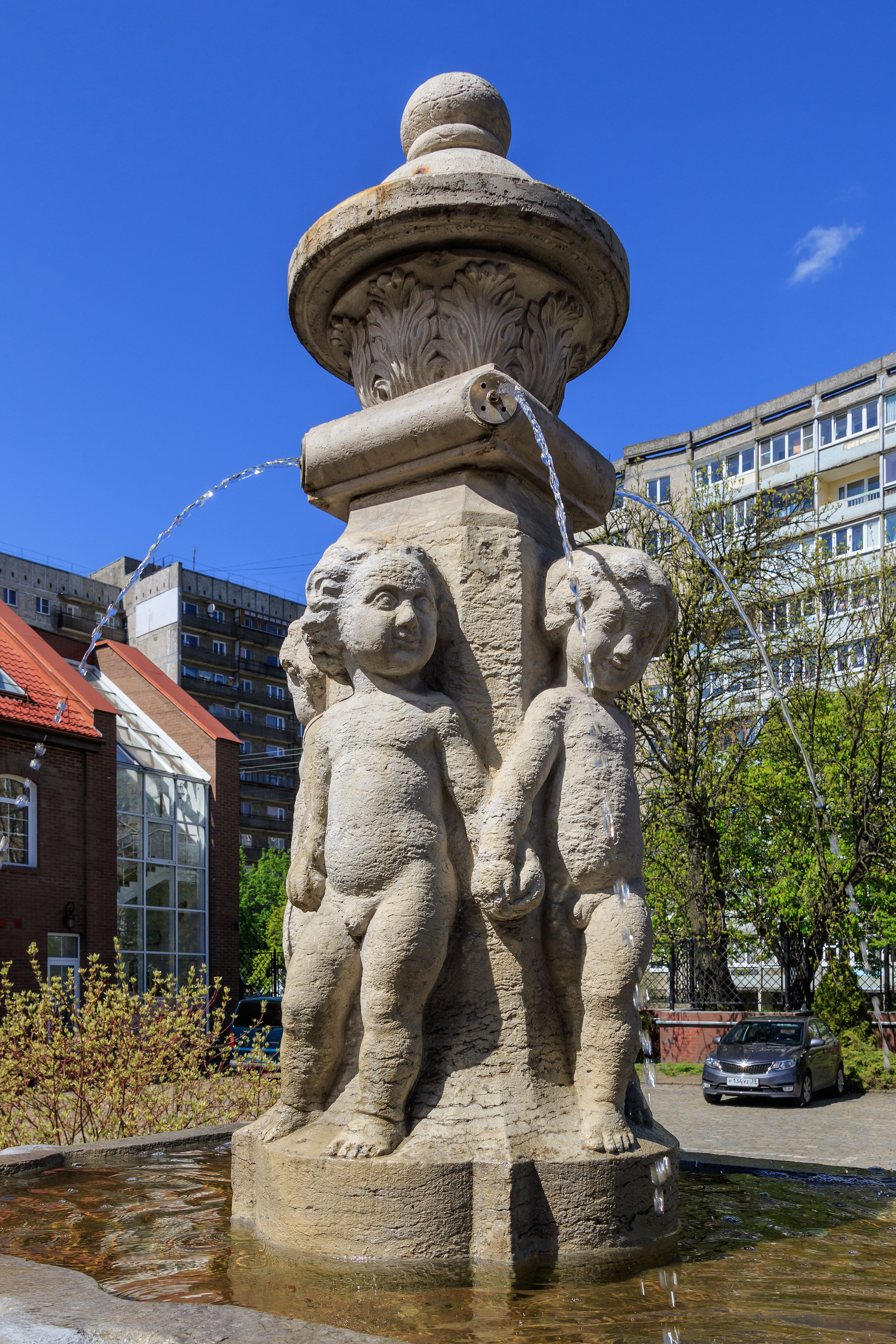
The Putti Fountain

Cauer was born in Bad Kreuznach, the fourth of nine children born to the sculptor Robert Cauer and his wife Auguste, née Schmidt. His younger brother Friedrich also became a sculptor.

At the age of fifteen, Cauer began taking lessons from his father at their studio in Rome. He then went on several study trips to France and the Netherlands. After his father's death in 1893, he was persuaded to take over the studio in Bad Kreuznach, but became involved in family squabbles. In 1897, he returned to Rome and married Anna Chidel, the sister of one of his German friends there.

Cauer was in Berlin by 1905 but, frustrated by the constant struggle to obtain commissions, he accepted an appointment to succeed Friedrich Reusch as a Professor and head of the sculpting classes at the Kunstakademie Königsberg. He was there for over thirty years. Otto Drengwitz, Hilde Leest, Paul Koralus and Fritz Szalinski were among his most notable students.

In 1925, Cauer organized an exhibition at the Academy, which included works by Käthe Kollwitz. From 1931, he began making extended stays at the Villa Romana in Florence, where he created portrait busts. He retired from the academy in 1941. For most of his time there, he was a member of the Academy of Arts, Berlin.

Cauer died in Königsberg in 1943 and was buried in the graveyard at the Juditten Church. His grave has not been preserved.

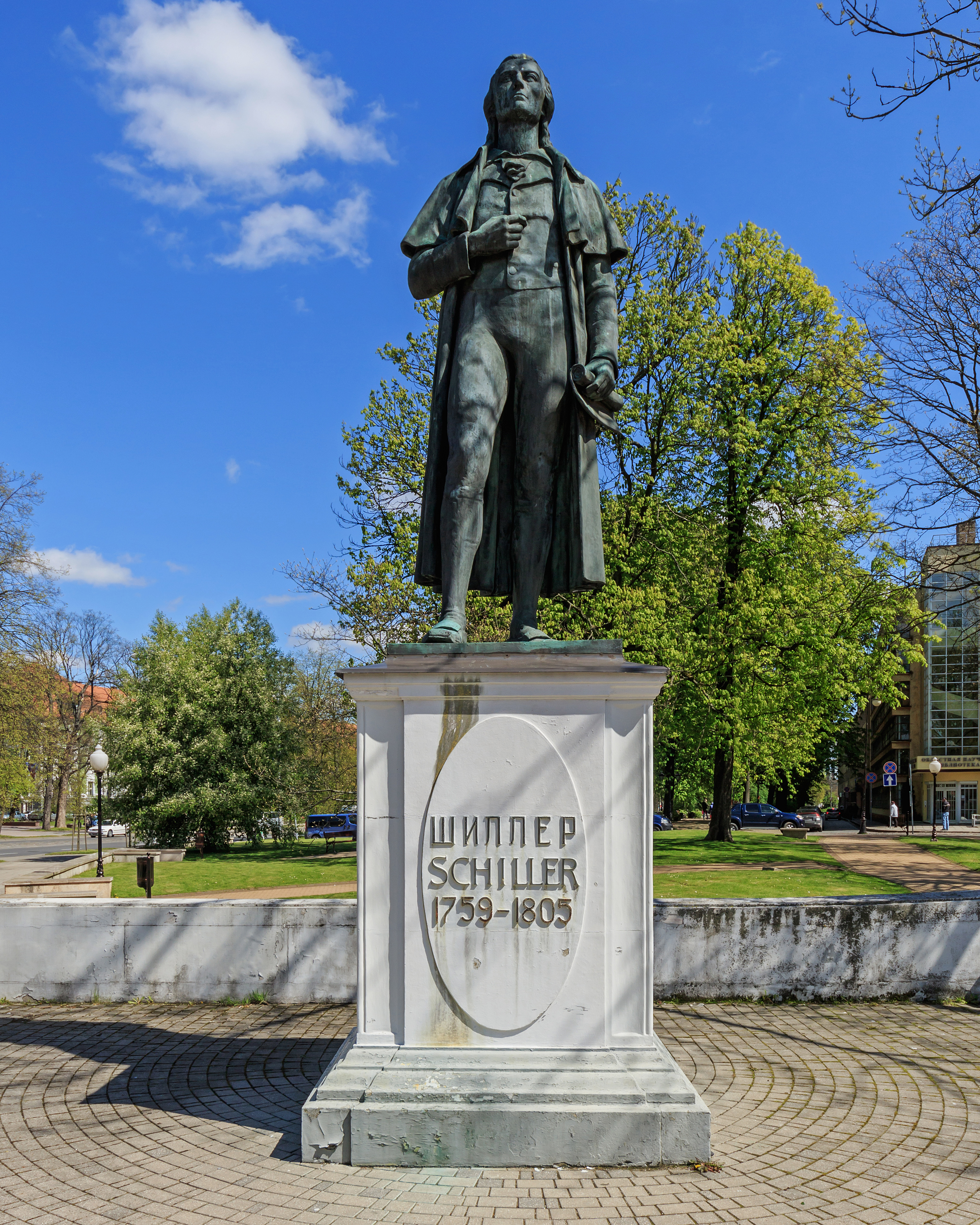
The Friedrich Schiller Monument in Kaliningrad

Cauer created statues in stone and bronze, as well as a number of fountains. In addition to the Schiller monument, his surviving works in Kaliningrad include a marble sculpture, "After the Bath", and three reliefs: two winged female figures and a Hercules. A statue known as "The Apple Thief" was destroyed. The "Putti Fountain", created in 1908 for the International Fountain Fair in Posen, was moved several times and fell into disrepair, until after 2000, when it was restored and placed on the grounds of the Museum of the World's Oceans.
