= Friedrich Reusch =

German sculptor and art teacher

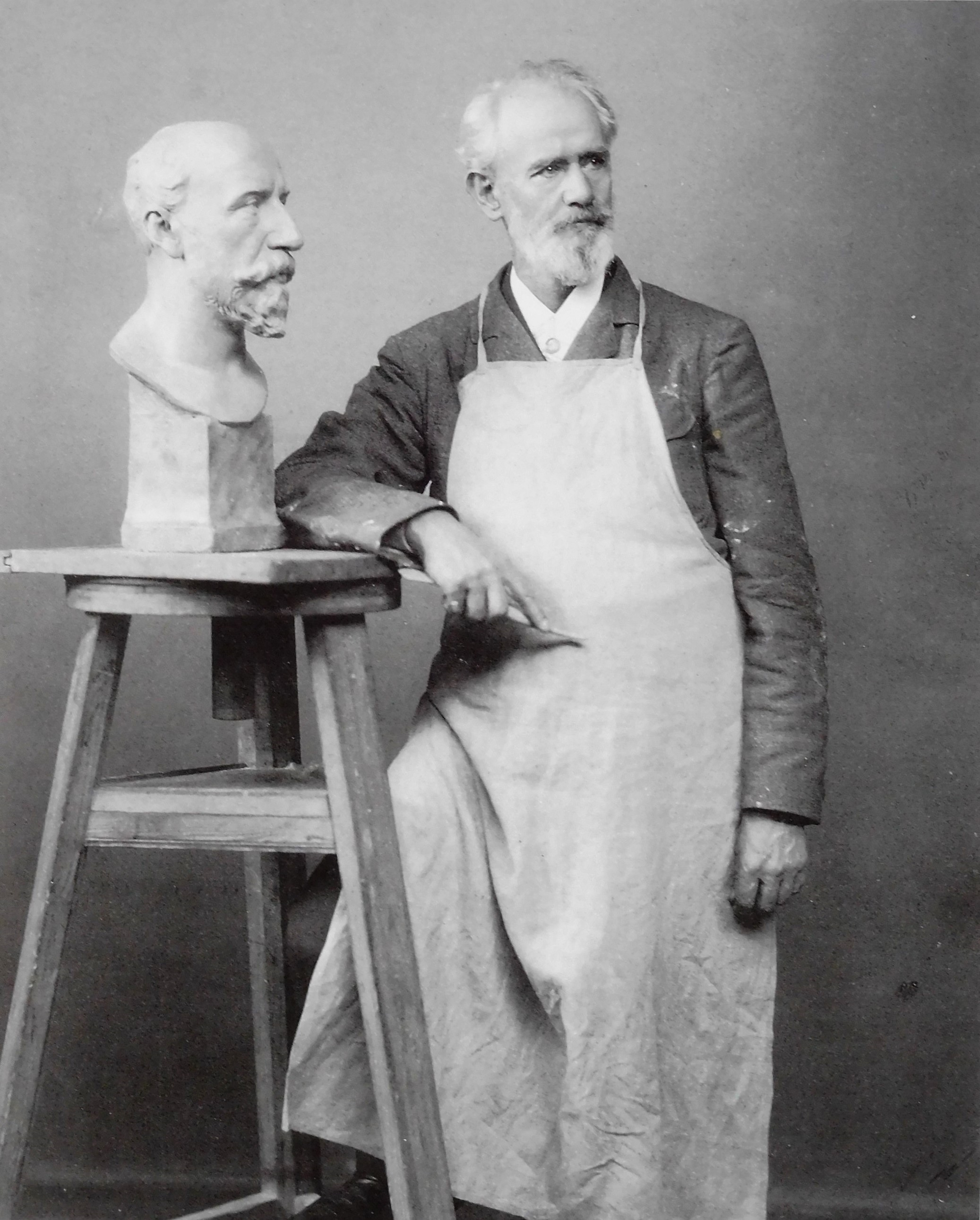
Friedrich Reusch in his studio (1896)

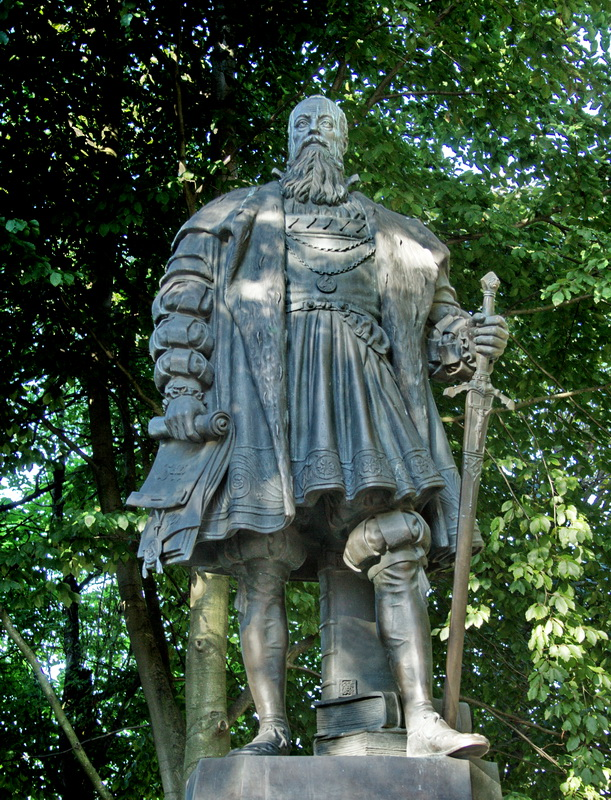
Albert, Duke of Prussia

Johann Friedrich Reusch (5 September 1843, Siegen – 15 October 1906, Agrigento) was a German sculptor and art teacher.

== Biography ==
He was born to a long-established family of craftsmen. His father was a master carpenter. Initially, he was going to follow him into the carpentry trade, but his artistic talents were noticed by the sculptor, August Kiss, who advised him to go to Berlin to study. There, he attended the Prussian Academy of Arts until 1867, after which he worked at the studios of Albert Wolff, whom he assisted on an equestrian monument to King Frederick William III.

In 1872, he was awarded a scholarship by the Michael Beer Foundation, enabling him to study in Rome. After his return to Berlin in 1874, he went into business as a freelance sculptor. His major works include the marble group, “Marktverkehr" (Market traffic, 1879, now lost) for the Belle-Alliance Bridge (now the Halle-Gate Bridge), and “Der Dämon des Dampfes" (The Demon of Steam, 1880) for the Technical University.

He was appointed a Professor and head of the sculpture classes at the Kunstakademie Königsberg in 1881. He also served as its director. While there, he executed numerous busts, memorials and decorative figures for public buildings; notably the statues of "Albert, Duke of Prussia" (1891), and Kaiser Wilhelm I (1894), both outside Königsberg Castle.

In 1900, he began to suffer from a heart condition. By 1904, he was forced to give up teaching. He died in 1906, on a vacation trip to Sicily. He never married, but was accompanied throughout his life by his housekeeper, Rosa, who was with him when he died.

He is buried in his hometown. Several of his works are there, including a "Soldiers' Monument" (1877), an equestrian statue of Kaiser Wilhelm I (1892), and a bronze statue of "Otto von Bismarck" (1900).

== Sources ==
- Reusch, Joh. Friedrich. In: Hermann Alexander Müller: Biographisches Künstler-Lexikon. Leipzig 1882, pg.436, Online
- Reusch, Friedrich. In: Meyers Großes Konversations-Lexikon. 6th edition. Vol. 16, Bibliographisches Institut, Leipzig/Vienna 1908, p. 839.
- Herbert Meinhard Mühlpfordt: Der Siegner Bildhauer Johann Friedrich Reusch. Leben und Werk. Zum 75. Todestag am 15. Oktober 1981. J.-G.-Herder-Bibliothek Siegerland, Siegen 1981
