= Ratshof =

District of Königsberg, Germany (now in Russia)

Coordinates: 54°43′11″N 20°27′14″E

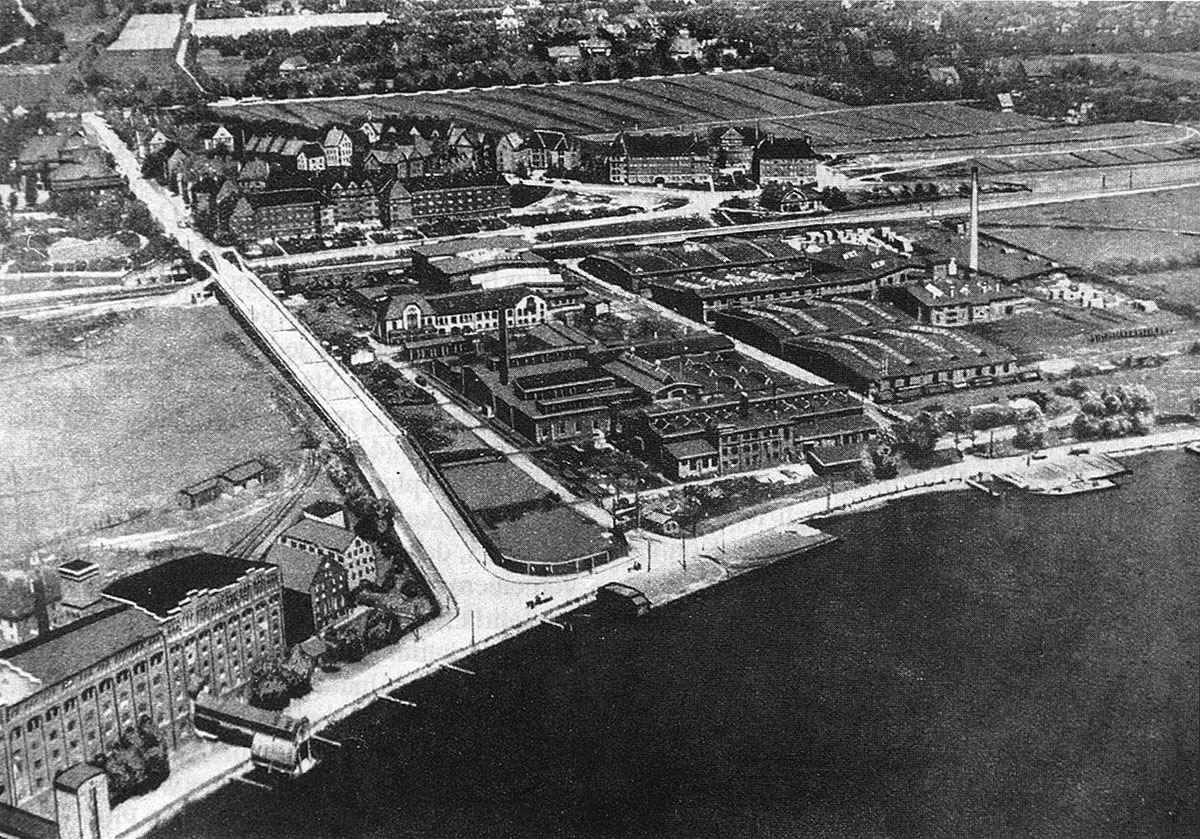
Ratshof and the Pregel River from the south.

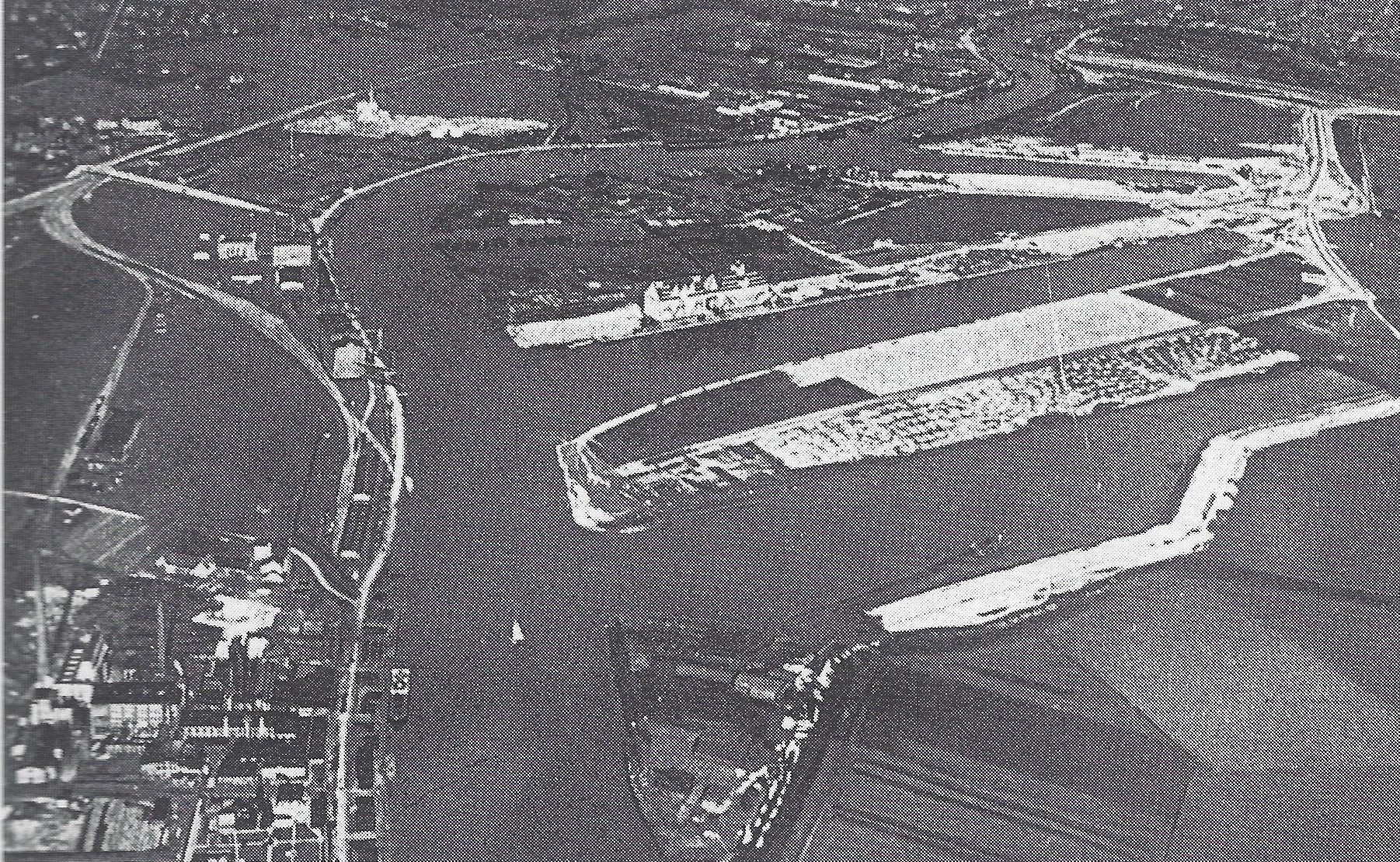
View of the Pregel from the west. Ratshof is in the lower left, Contienen in the lower right, and the 1920s-era docks are the upper right

Ratshof or Rathshof was a suburban quarter of western Königsberg, Germany. Its territory is now part of the Tsentralny District of Kaliningrad, Russia.

== History ==
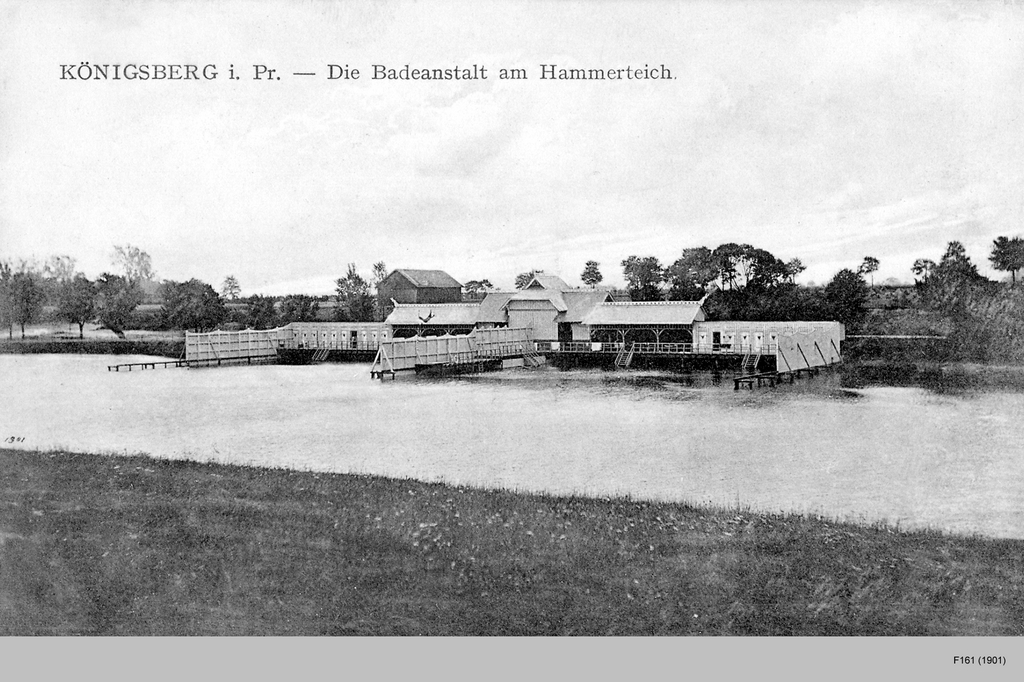
Public baths along the pond Hammerteich.

The estate Propsthof, in the broad Hufen region between Altstadt and Lawsken, was established by the Teutonic Knights. In 1533 Altstadt Church sold Propsthof to the Altstadt councilor Bernhard Betner. The estate was subsequently known as Ratshubenhof and then Ratshof; it is unknown if it was renamed in honor of Betner himself or the Altstadt town council (Rat). It was also known as Altstädtischer Ratshof to differentiate it from Kneiphöfischer Ratshof near Rosenau in southern Königsberg. In 1586 Ratshof was owned by Urban Rodemann.

Over centuries Ratshof functioned as an iron forge, a farming estate, an upper class establishment, and a children's nursing facility. Also in the vicinity were the Hammerteich pond and the beloved Hammerkrug inn. In 1806 the estate was acquired by the bailiff Wendland of Kaporn, who expanded it with land from the nearby Wilky forest and converted Ratshof into a large estate in 1817. From 1843 to 1883 it was owned by the Batocki family. In 1849 the Hammerkrug inn was purchased by councilor Tortilowicz von Batocki-Friebe.

At the end of the 19th century, Allgemeine-Wohnungs-Bauverein, a private development company, developed Ratshof into a Gartenstadt according to the garden city movement. By 1905 the growing suburb was incorporated into the city of Königsberg (Stadtkreis Königsberg i. Pr.).

In 1916 the Kunstakademie Königsberg moved from Neue Sorge to Ratshof. The quarter's stadium, Sportplatz Hammerteich, hosted the football club SpVgg ASCO Königsberg. Ratshof Church was constructed in 1937. In southern Ratshof on the northern shore of the Pregel River were the Waggonfabrik factory of L. Steinfurt, warehouses, a pulp mill, and a chemical factory.
