= Edict of Emancipation =

Edict of Emancipation may refer to:

- The Emancipation Proclamation, an 1863 directive by President Abraham Lincoln during the American Civil War
- The Prussian Edict of Emancipation, the granting of Prussian citizenship to all Jews in 1812 during the Prussian reforms
- Emancipation reform of 1861, liquidation of serfdom in the Russian Empire
