= Elisabeth von Staegemann =

German writer, painter, salonist and noble

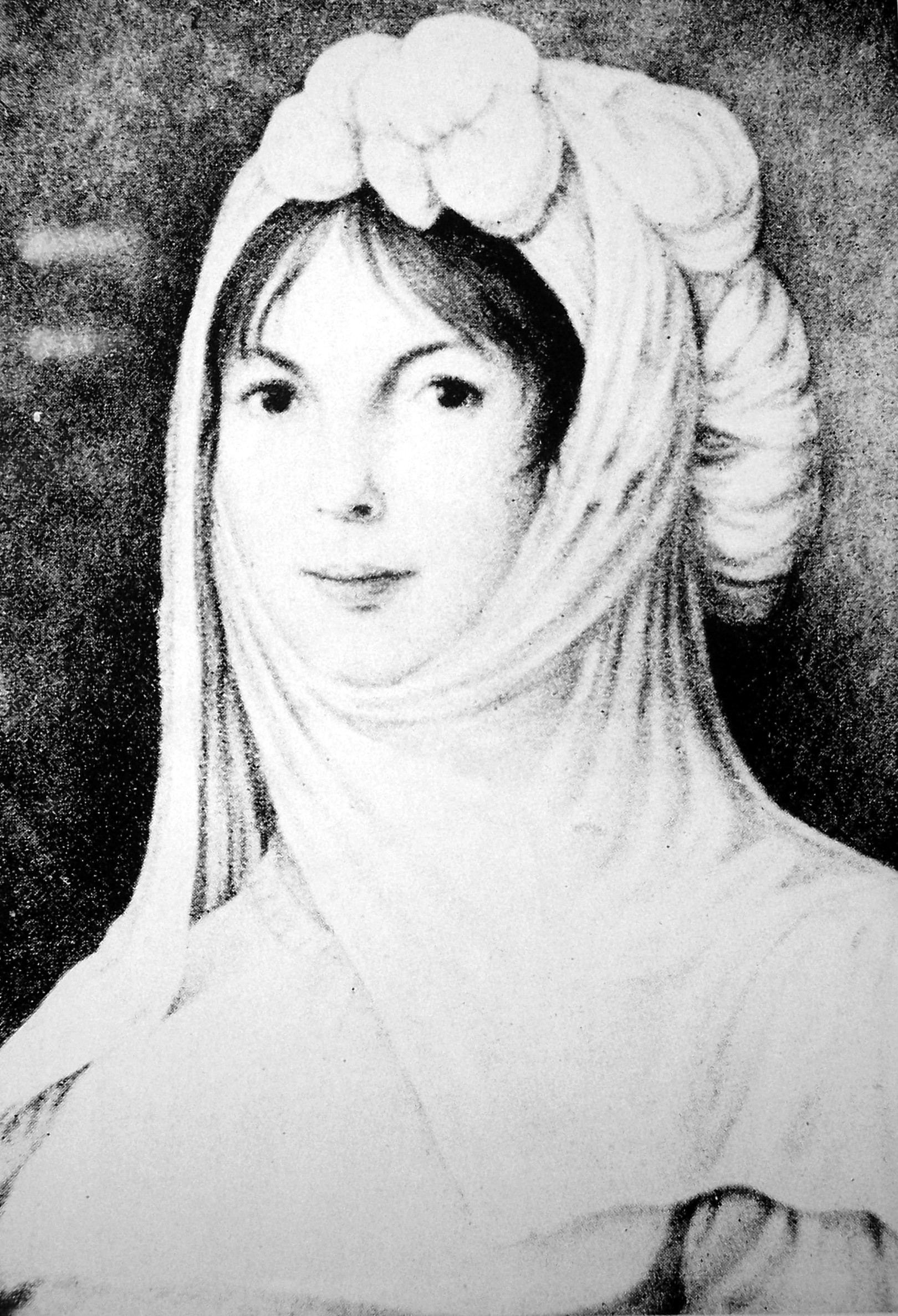
- Born: Johanna Elisabeth Fischer; 11 April 1761; Königsberg, Prussia
- Died: 11 July 1835 (aged 74); Berlin, Kingdom of Prussia
- Occupations: Writer, painter

Johanna Elisabeth von Staegemann (née Fischer; 11 April 1761 – 11 July 1835) was a writer, painter, salonist and noble from the Kingdom of Prussia. She held one of the most famous salons of contemporary Germany in Königsberg and Berlin.

== Life ==
Staegemann was born on 11 April 1761, in Königsberg, to Prussian businessman Kommerzienrat Johann Jakob Fischer (died 1786) and Regina nee Hartung (1734–1805) grew up in Königsberg, Prussia.

In her liberal society, open to the arts and science, she gained a reputation as a young woman. She was known to Johann Friedrich Reichardt, Immanuel Kant and Theodor Gottlieb von Hippel, among others. The writer and diplomat Friedrich Gentz and the poet Friedrich August Staegemann were among her admirers.

In 1780, she married Justizrat Graun, son of the composer Carl Heinrich Graun. When her husband was called to Berlin in 1787, Elisabeth stayed with her two children and her mother alone in Königsberg for eight years. Towards the end of the 1780s, she established a salon-like social gathering and followed her husband to Berlin in 1795, but filed for divorce at the end of the year.

A year later she married her aforementioned admirer Friedrich August Staegemann in Königsberg. In 1806, she returned to Berlin again.

Due to the Prussian defeat in the battle of Jena and Auerstedt, the Staegemanns went back to East Prussia with the royal family. Here, she continued the operation of a salon. Their children became playmates for the princes and princesses. Friendly ties were also established with Prince Janusz Radziwiłł and his wife Luise von Prussia.

After a three-year stay in Königsberg, the family returned to Berlin circa 1810. She intensified the operation of her salon there. As wife of the state councilor, Staegemann soon played a leading role in Berlin's cultural life, especially since her friend Rahel Varnhagen's salon was dissolved in 1806, leaving a social vacuum.

In the late 1820s, Staegemann stopped participating in the salon due to illness. Her (now married) daughter Hedwig von Olfers took her place as hostess. Since her time as Salonnière, she wrote and painted sporadically, including some self-portraits; but she saw herself as an amateur all her life. She died in Berlin, on 11 July 1835, aged 74. Her husband dedicated the Memories of Elisabeth to her, a collection of sonnets that he had written for her since the beginning of their relationship. Her grave is located in Kreuzberg. She rests there next to her second husband and their granddaughter Marie von Olfers.

== Family ==
Elisabeth Fischer married Ferdinand Graun on 26 July 1780, divorcing in 1795. They had two children, Ferdinand Graun and Antonie Theodora Graun.

In September 1796, she married Friedrich August von Staegemann (1763-1840), who, in 1816 by King Friedrich Wilhelm III, was made a member of the Prussian nobility. Their children were August von Staegemann (1797–1866) and Hedwig von Staegemann (1799–1891).

Elisabeth von Staegemann founded a Salonnière dynasty through her daughter from Hedwig, which her granddaughter Marie von Olfers (1826–1924) continued. Her great-granddaughter was Sibylle von Olfers.

== Salon ==
The Salon of Elisabeth Staegemann, they since about 1810 free every day (sometimes Wednesdays) only in the Hunter Street, then called together (since 1818) in the Charlotte Street 68, on Dönhoffplatz (from 1825) and finally in the Charlotte Street 31 (since 1831),

Historically, the salon stands between the enlightenment and romanticism periods. As with many other contemporary salons, the relative freedom from class barriers in the selection of guests and their mutual interaction is sociologically significant. Staegemann's own artistic talents also gave the salon special access to poetry and music. Writers like Clemens Brentano and Achim von Arnim presented their works here. Numerous statesmen and military men of the Prussian reform period also attended.

== Notable habitués ==
- Karl vom Stein zum Altenstein
- Achim von Arnim
- Christian Günther von Bernstorff
- Hermann von Boyen
- Clemens Brentano
- Friedrich Bury
- Angelica Catalani
- Adelbert von Chamisso
- Helmina von Chézy
- Carl von Clausewitz
- Henriette von Crayen
- Friedrich Ferdinand Alexander zu Dohna-Schlobitten
- Friedrich Christoph Förster
- Friedrich de la Motte-Fouqué
- Eduard Gans
- Friedrich von Gentz
- Ludwig Friedrich Leopold von Gerlach
- August Neidhardt von Gneisenau
- August Friedrich Ferdinand von der Goltz
- Karl August von Hardenberg
- Leopold von Henning
- Luise Hensel
- Wilhelm Hensel
- Aloys Hirt
- Julius Eduard Hitzig
- E. T. A. Hoffmann
- Heinrich Gustav Hotho
- Alexander von Humboldt
- Wilhelm von Humboldt
- Johann Erdmann Hummel
- Friedrich Adolf von Kalckreuth
- Karl Albert von Kamptz
- Bernhard Klein
- Heinrich von Kleist
- Christian Gottfried Körner
- Carl Friedrich Heinrich von Wylich und Lottum
- Adam Müller von Nitterdorf
- Ignaz von Olfers
- Ernst von Pfuel
- Hermann von Pückler-Muskau
- Christian Daniel Rauch
- Johann Friedrich Reichardt
- Pierre Rode
- Friedrich Carl von Savigny
- Theodor von Schön
- Heinrich Friedrich Karl vom und zum Stein
- Bogislav Friedrich Emanuel von Tauentzien
- Friedrich Karl von Tettenborn
- Ludwig Tieck
- Karl August Varnhagen von Ense
- Rahel Varnhagen
- Wilhelm Freiherr von Willisen
- Peter von Winter
- Friedrich August Wolf

== Works ==
- Memories for Noble Women (Erinnerungen für edle Frauen). 2 volumes, Leipzig 1858.
