= Wilhelm Anton von Klewitz =

Prussian politician

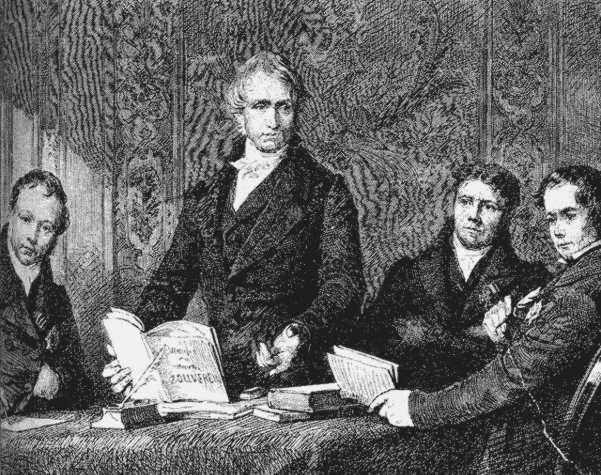
Wilhelm Anton von Klewiz

Wilhelm Anton von Klewitz or Klewiz (1 August 1760, Magdeburg – 26 July 1838, Magdeburg) was a Prussian politician and civil servant notable for his part in the Prussian reforms.
