= Karl vom Stein zum Altenstein =

Prussian politician (1770–1840)

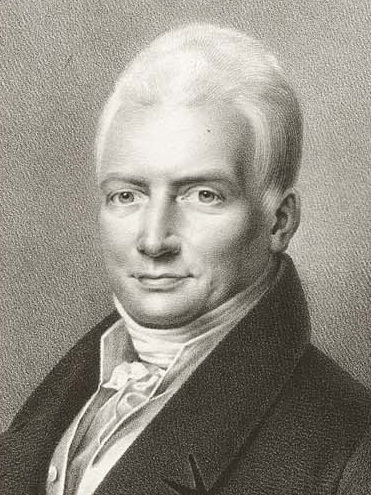
Karl vom Stein zum Altenstein, lithograph 1826

Karl Sigmund Franz Freiherr vom Stein zum Altenstein (1 October 1770, in Schalkhausen near Ansbach – 14 May 1840, in Berlin) was a Prussian politician and the first Prussian education minister. His most lasting impact was the reform of the Prussian educational system.

== Early life ==
The Altensteins were descended from a long-established Franconian noble family, whose family seat of Altenstein Castle was located on a ridge between Ebern and Maroldsweisach. Karl was born in 1770 as the son of the count-hussar captain and chamberlin Ernst Freiherr von Stein zum Altenstein of the Ostheim vor der Rhön branch of the family, and his mother was Juliana Philippina Wilhelmina Freiin von Adelsheim, Ernsts's second wife. Karl was born in their castle at Obermörgerscheimp. After his education at the gymnasium and corps, he studied law in Erlangen, in 1790 in Göttingen, and later in Jena.

== Career ==
In 1793, he joined the referendary of the Prussian war and council chamber. His overseer, Karl August von Hardenberg, quickly recognized his talent and encouraged him to join the diplomatic corps. In 1799, he went with Hardenberg to Berlin where he worked for as a Ministerialrat and later became a senior financial officer for the general directorate. As a result of Prussia's losses in the Fourth Coalition War of the Napoleonic Wars at the battle of Jena-Auerstedt, he went with Hardenberg in 1806 to Tilsit to work on the Prussian Reforms.

Plans for insurrection against the French occupation stalled the state minister Karl Freiherr vom Stein's reform plans. In 1808, Altenstein became his successor as the head of administration of Finance. He could not prevail against the forces set in motion by his predecessor to introduce reform so he continued them with the same energy. In 1810, Prussia could no longer afford the reparations agreed to in the Peace of Tilsit. Altenstein suggested the cessation of Silesia to France and so was dismissed in June by King Frederick William III at the instigation of Hardenberg.

After his release, he went to Breslau where he was appointed civil governor of Silesia in 1813. After the Congress of Vienna in 1815, he, together with Wilhelm von Humboldt in Paris, reclaimed treasures that had been confiscated by Napoleon.

In 1817, he took over as head of the newly formed Ministry of Culture, again answering to Hardenberg, now State Chancellor. He was charged with the political responsibility of refounding the Evangelical Church in Prussia. In the next 20 years he reformed the Prussian schools, radically changing education. He is credited with the first "humanistic" school of education and the University of Bonn in 1818. With the Education Act of 1819, he developed a master plan for the system that still persists today: a multi-unit school system with a differentiation between primary and secondary education. In 1825, he extended compulsory education to the entire country, and in 1834, he introduced a mandatory curriculum for Gymnasiums. In subsequent years, he fought for the education system to be independent of the church.

=== Later life ===
He retired in 1838 because of declining health and died in 1840. He is buried in Berlin at the Dreifaltigkeitskirchhof II.
