= Friedrich August von Staegemann =

Prussian politician and diplomat

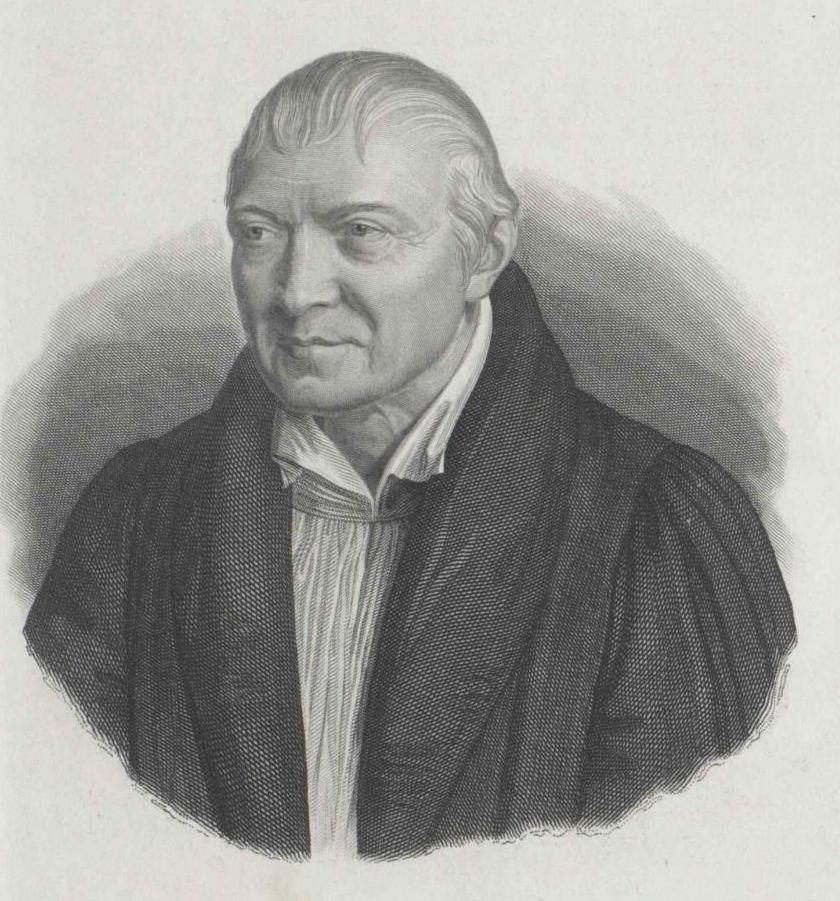
Friedrich August von Staegemann

Friedrich August von Staegemann (7 November 1763 in Vierraden (Uckermark) - 17 December 1840 in Berlin) was a Prussian politician and diplomat.

In September 1796, he married Elisabeth von Staegemann.
