= Congress =

Formal meeting of representatives

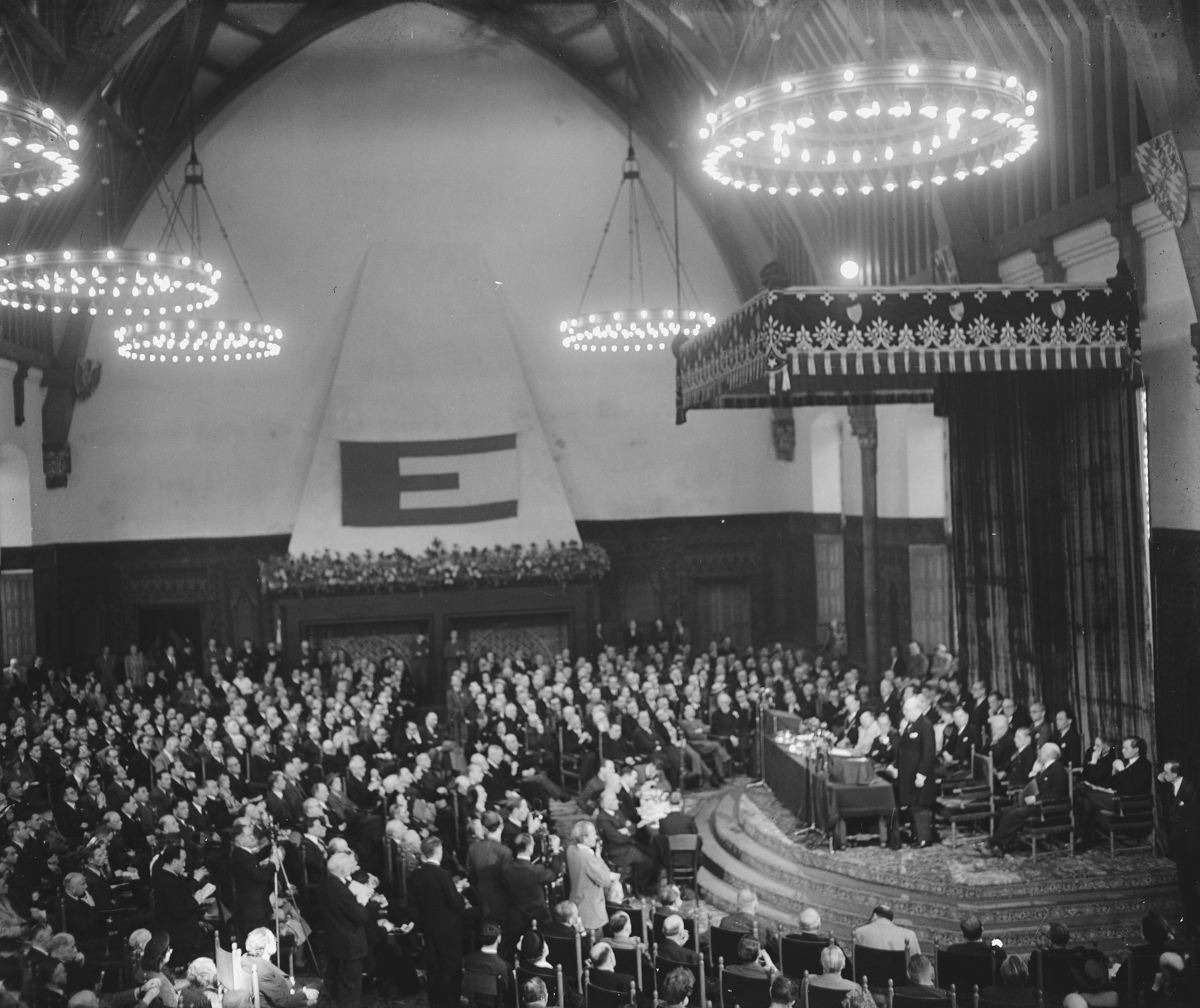
Meeting in the Hall of Knights in The Hague during the Congress of Europe, 1948

A congress is a formal meeting of the representatives of different countries, constituent states, organizations, trade unions, political parties, or other groups. The term originated in Late Middle English to denote an encounter (meeting of adversaries) during battle, from the Latin congressus.

== Political congresses ==
=== International relations ===
The following congresses were formal meetings of representatives of different nations:

- The Congress of Aix-la-Chapelle (1668), which ended the War of Devolution
- The Congress of Aix-la-Chapelle (1748), which ended the War of the Austrian Succession
- The Congress of Aix-la-Chapelle (1818)
- The Congress of Berlin (1878), which settled the Eastern Question after the Russo-Turkish War (1877–1878)
- The Congress of Gniezno (1000)
- The Congress of Laibach (1821)
- The Congress of Panama, an 1826 meeting organized by Simón Bolívar
- The Congress of Paris (1856), which ended the Crimean War
- The Congress of Troppau (1820)
- The Congress of Tucumán (1816)
- The Congress of Utrecht (1712–1713)
- The Congress of Verona (1822)
- The Congress of Vienna (1814–15), which settled the shape of Europe after the Napoleonic Wars
- The Congress of the Council of Europe.

=== Legislatures ===
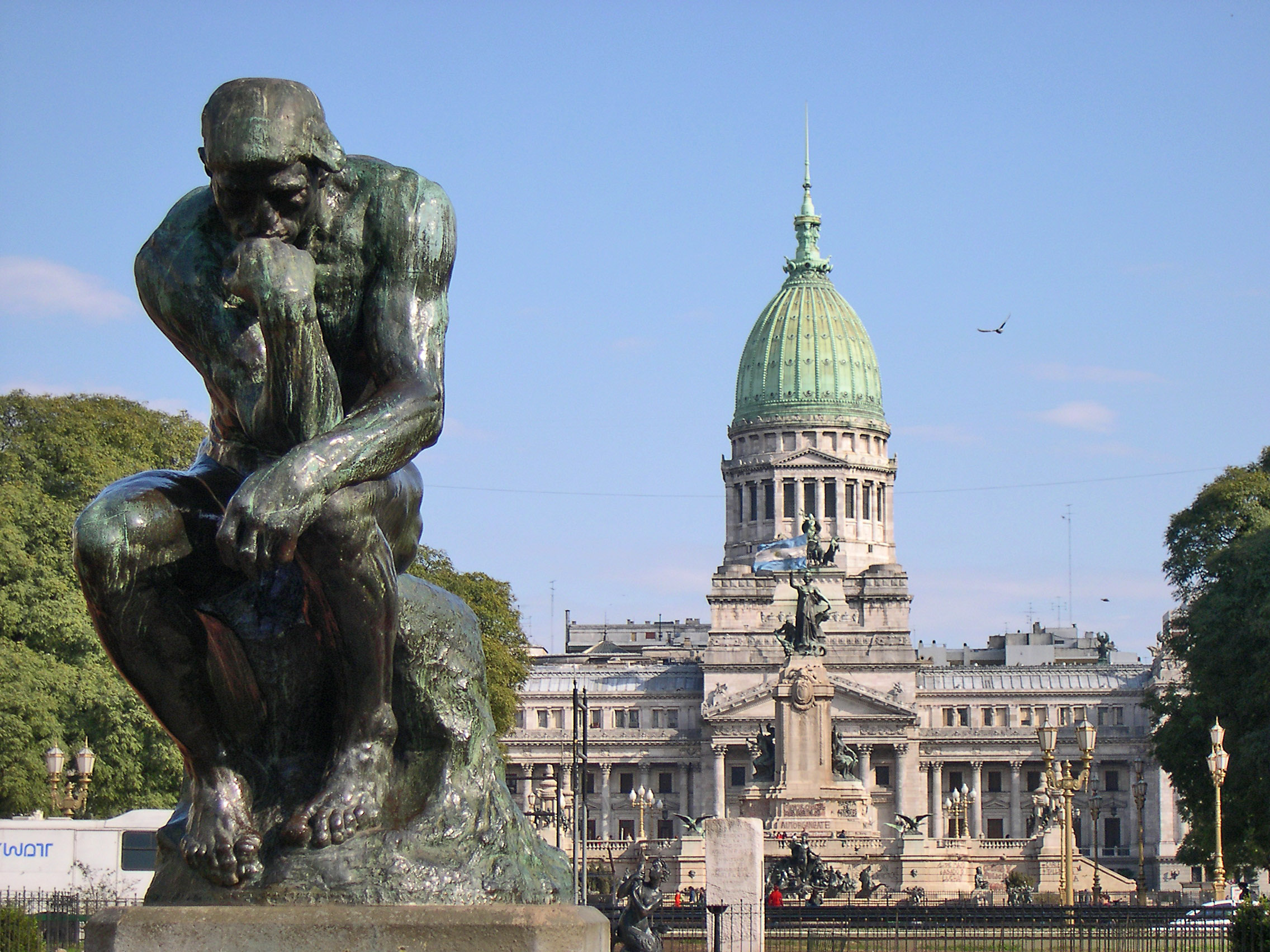
Argentine National Congress in Buenos Aires

==== Presidential and semi-presidential systems ====
In the mid-1770s, the British colonies that became the United States of America adopted for their joint convention the word "Congress" - to emphasize each colony's status as a state in its own right. The term has been adopted by many countries to refer to their legislatures.

- The United States Congress is the bicameral legislative branch of the United States federal government.
  - The Continental Congress (1774–1781) was a convention of delegates from the Thirteen Colonies that became the Congress of the Confederation (1781–1789), legislature of the United States under the Articles of Confederation.
  - The Confederate States Congress of 1861–1865 operated in the Confederate States of America during the American Civil War.
- The Congress of Guatemala (Spanish: Congreso de la República) is the unicameral legislature of Guatemala.
- The National Congress of Honduras (Spanish: Congreso nacional) is the legislative branch of the government of Honduras.
- The Congress of Mexico (Spanish: Congreso de la Unión) is the legislative branch of the Mexican government.
- The Congress of Paraguay is the bicameral legislature of Paraguay.
- The Congress of the Argentine Nation (Spanish: Congreso de la Nación Argentina) is the legislative branch of the government of Argentina.
- The Congress of the Dominican Republic is the bicameral legislature of the Dominican Republic.
- The Palau National Congress (Palauan: Olbiil era Kelulau) is the bicameral legislative branch of the Republic of Palau.
- The Congress of the Federated States of Micronesia is the unicameral legislature of the Federated States of Micronesia.
- The Congress of the Philippines (Filipino: Kongreso ng Pilipinas) is the legislative branch of the Philippine government.
- The Congress of the Republic of Peru (Spanish: Congreso de la República) is the bicameral legislature of Peru.
- The Congress of Colombia (Spanish: Congreso de la República) is the bicameral legislature of Colombia.
- The National Congress of Bolivia was the national legislature of Bolivia before being replaced by the Plurinational Legislative Assembly.
- The National Congress of Brazil (Portuguese: Congresso Nacional) is the bicameral legislature of Brazil.
- The National Congress of Chile (Spanish: Congreso Nacional) is the legislative branch of the government of Chile.
- The National Congress of Ecuador was the unicameral legislature of Ecuador before being replaced by the National Assembly.
- France:
  - The Congress of the French Parliament refers specifically to when both houses of France's legislature sit together as a single body, usually at the Palace of Versailles, to vote on revisions to the Constitution, to listen to an address by the President of the French Republic, and, in the past, to elect the President of the Republic.
  - The Congress of New Caledonia is the national legislature under the semi-presidential system of the autonomous sui generis collectivity.

==== Non-presidential systems ====
- Spanish Congress of Deputies (Spanish: Congreso de los Diputados) is the lower house of the Cortes Generales, Spain's legislative branch.
- The National Congress of Belgium was a temporary legislative assembly in 1830, which created a constitution for the new state.
- The legislature of the People's Republic of China is known in English as the National People's Congress.
- The Congress of People's Deputies of the Soviet Union was the legislature and nominal supreme institution of state power in the Soviet Union.
  - Congress of People's Deputies of Russia was modeled after the Soviet Union's and existed in 1990–1993.
- The Congress of Cuba was the bicameral legislature of Cuba from 1902 to 1959.

=== Parties ===
Many political parties have a party congress every few years to make decisions for the party and elect governing bodies, while others call it a party convention. Congress is included in the name of several political parties, especially those in former British colonies:

- India
  - Indian National Congress
  - All India Trinamool Congress
  - Kerala Congress
  - Nationalist Congress Party
  - Tamil Maanila Congress
  - YSR Congress
  - Janta Congress Chhattisgarh
  - All India N.R. Congress
- Canary Islands
  - National Congress of the Canaries
- Eswatini
  - Ngwane National Liberatory Congress
- Fiji
  - National Congress of Fiji
- Guyana
  - People's National Congress
- Lesotho
  - Basotho Congress Party
  - Lesotho Congress for Democracy
  - Lesotho People's Congress
- Malawi
  - Malawi Congress Party
- Malaysia
  - Malaysian Indian Congress
- Namibia
  - Congress of Democrats
- Nepal
  - Nepali Congress
- Pakistan
  - Peoples Revolutionary Congress Pakistan
  - Pakistan Christian Congress
- Sierra Leone
  - All People's Congress
- South Africa
  - African National Congress
  - Congress of the People
  - Pan-Africanist Congress
- Sri Lanka
  - All Ceylon Tamil Congress
  - Sri Lanka Muslim Congress
- Sudan
  - National Congress (Sudan)
- Trinidad and Tobago
  - United National Congress
- Uganda
  - Ugandan People's Congress
- Iraqi National Congress

=== Political organizations ===
- National Congress of American Indians
- Congress of Racial Equality
- Continental Congress 2.0

== Labor congresses ==
- Congress of Industrial Organizations
- Trade Union Congress of the Philippines
- Trades Union Congress
- Canadian Labour Congress

== Religious Congresses ==
- Catholic Congresses
- Eucharistic Congresses
- 1947 Marian Congress
- Subud Congress

== Non-political congresses ==
Congress is an alternative name for a large national or international academic conference. For instance, the World Congress on Men's Health is an annual meeting on men's medical issues.

Organizations in some athletic sports, such as bowling, have historically been named "congresses". The predecessors to the United States Bowling Congress (formed in 1995) were the American Bowling Congress (founded in 1895) and the Women's International Bowling Congress (founded in 1927).

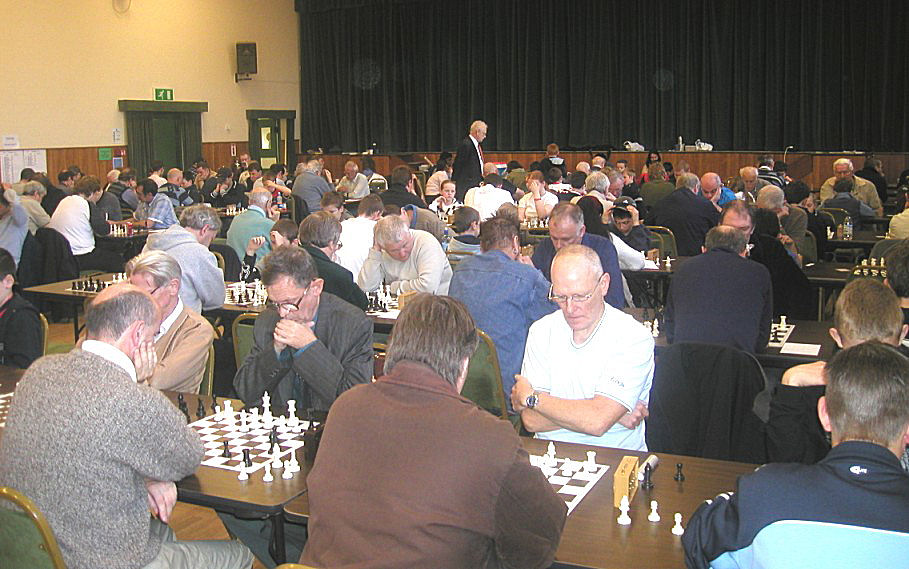
Chess congress

A chess congress is a chess tournament, in one city, where a large number of contestants gather to play competitive chess over a limited period of time; typically one day to one week, or more.

ICCA Congress & Exhibition
