= Treaty of Potsdam (1805) =

1805 treaty between Prussia and Russia

- Signed: 3 November 1805
- Location: Potsdam
- Signatories: Alexander I; Frederick William III
- Parties: Russian Empire; (Kingdom of Prussia) Prussia

The Treaty of Potsdam (also known as the Potsdam Agreement) was a treaty signed during the War of the Third Coalition on 3 November 1805 between Alexander I of the Russian Empire and Frederick William III of Prussia. It required Prussia to mediate negotiations between Napoleon's French Empire and Russia, and if the negotiations failed, join the Third Coalition.

== Background ==
Europe was embroiled in the French Revolutionary Wars from 1791 to 1802. After five years of war, the First French Republic subdued the armies of the First Coalition in 1797. The Second Coalition was formed in 1798, but it too was defeated by 1802, when Britain and France signed the Treaty of Amiens on 25 March 1802. The peace was to be short lived, with Britain declaring war on France on 18 May 1803 and starting the War of the Third Coalition. After two years of war, other European nations decided to join the war on the side of the British.

Napoleon subsequently took over Genoa, Piedmont, Naples and Elba, converted the Cisalpine Republic into the Italian Republic, crowned himself emperor in imitation of Charlemagne and reduced the size of the Holy Roman Empire in violation of the Treaty of Amiens. That led the Austrian Empire, together with the incentive of British gold, to consider joining the war. Though Russia and Britain initially disagreed, the execution of Louis Antoine, Duke of Enghien, angered Alexander I of Russia. After an agreement between the two countries, where the British offered to pay 1,250,000 pounds a year for every 100,000 troops Russia put up, they agreed to join the fighting on 11 April 1805. Austria joined on 9 August 1805. The Kingdom of Sweden entered into an offensive and defensive alliance with Britain on 31 August and the Kingdom of Naples joined the coalition through a treaty agreed with Russia in September.

During this time Prussia remained neutral through the work of Frenchman Charles Maurice de Talleyrand-Périgord, who transferred control of Hanover to Prussia. The country had also signed the Peace of Basel in 1795, agreeing to remain neutral. Napoleon soon became confident Prussia would remain neutral. Throughout the war, the country aimed to appease both Napoleon and Alexander I, but favored Russia. In an agreement signed in Saint Petersburg in May 1804, Prussia entered into a secret alliance with Russia.

== Treaty and aftermath ==
The Treaty of Potsdam was signed on 3 November 1805 between Alexander I of the Russian Empire and Frederick William III of Prussia. In front of Queen Luise, the treaty was signed near the tombs of Frederick II and Frederick William I at the Garrison Church in Potsdam. In the treaty, Prussia agreed to mediate negotiations between the French Empire and Russia in exchange for British subsidies. If the attempt at mediation failed, Prussia agreed to raise an 80,000-man army and join the war on the side of the Third Coalition. The treaty was ratified on 15 November.

Historian Michael Broers argues that Fredrick William was reluctant to join the coalition, as was relatively pro-French Christian von Haugwitz, the foreign minister of Prussia. Alexander I was supported by statesman Karl August von Hardenberg. In the weeks after the signing of the treaty, the Prussian capital saw rising anti-French sentiment, led by Hardenberg. To begin negotiations, Prussia sent Haugwitz to Napoleon's headquarters in Austria. After his departure, anti-French feelings rose further. While Haugwitz was travelling, Napoleon decisively won the Battle of Austerlitz against Austria and Russia on 2 December 1805, effectively ending the war, and 'destroying' the treaty. The treaty was superseded by the Treaty of Schönbrunn signed between Prussia and France on 15 December. After Napoleon created the Confederation of the Rhine, Prussia declared war on the French Empire in October 1806, starting the War of the Fourth Coalition.

Historian Andrew Roberts wrote that "rarely has a treaty ... been more swiftly overtaken by events."

== Bibliography ==
- Broers, Michael (2018-04-03). Napoleon: The Spirit of the Age: 1805–1810. Pegasus Books. ISBN 9781681777252.
- Esdaile, Charles (2009). Napoleon's Wars: An International History. Penguin. ISBN 9781101464373.
- Esdaile, Charles J. (2014). The Wars of Napoleon. Routledge. ISBN 9781317899181.
- Osmańczyk, Edmund Jan (2003). Encyclopedia of the United Nations and International Agreements: A to F. Taylor & Francis. ISBN 9780415939218.
- Fremont-Barnes, Gregory (2013). The French Revolutionary Wars. Routledge. p. 25. ISBN 9781135977412.
- Knight, Charles (1814). 1760–1814. Bradbury, Evans.
- Koch, H. W. (2014). A History of Prussia. Routledge. ISBN 9781317873075.
- McLynn, Frank (1997). Napoleon: A Biography. New York: Arcade Publishing. ISBN 1-55970-631-7.
- Dawson, Jerry F. (2011). Friedrich Schleiermacher: The Evolution of a Nationalist. University of Texas Press. ISBN 9780292740730.
- Dwyer, Philip G. (2014). The Rise of Prussia 1700–1830. Routledge. ISBN 9781317887034.
- Pares, Sir Bernard (1965). A History of Russia. Vintage Books. ISBN 9780880296656.
- Philp, Mark (2016). Resisting Napoleon: The British Response to the Threat of Invasion, 1797–1815. Routledge. ISBN 9781351903851.
- Roberts, Andrew (2014). Napoleon: A Life. Penguin. ISBN 9780698176287.
- Scott, Hamish (2014). The Birth of a Great Power System, 1740–1815. Routledge. ISBN 9781317893547.
- Simms, Brendan (2002-06-27). The Impact of Napoleon: Prussian High Politics, Foreign Policy and the Crisis of the Executive, 1797–1806. Cambridge University Press. ISBN 9780521893855.
