= Hans Graf von Bülow =

German noble (1774–1825)

Graf Hans von Bülow
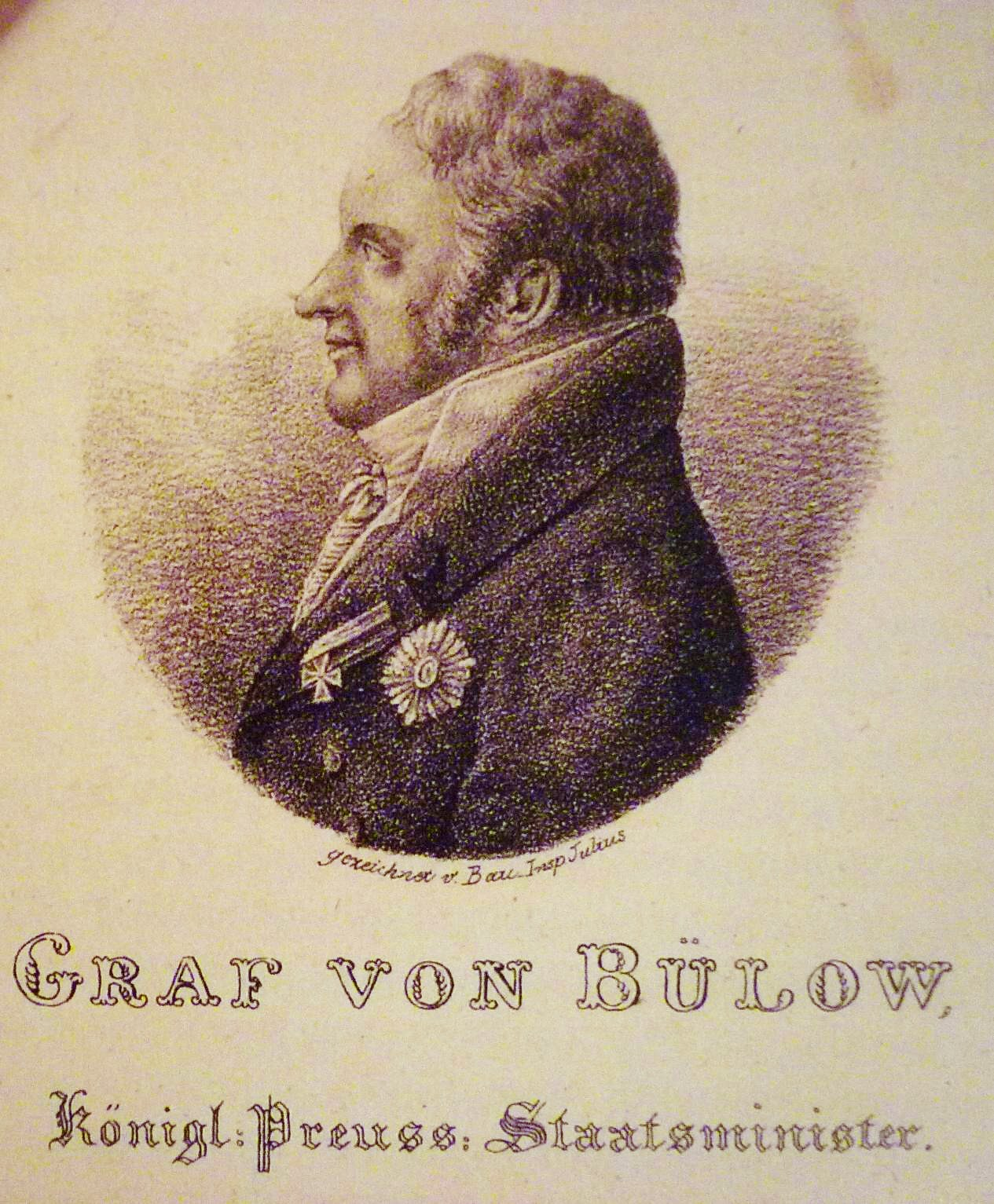
- Born: 14 July 1774; Essenrode, Electorate of Hanover
- Died: 11 August 1825 (aged 51); Bad Landeck, Silesia
- Occupation: Statesman
- Spouse: Johanna Schmucker (1781-1855)
- Parent(s): Friedrich Ernst von Bülow, Eleonore Louise von Behr

Ludwig Friedrich Victor Hans Graf von Bülow (14 July 1774, Essenrode, near Brunswick – 11 August 1825, Bad Landeck, Silesia) was a Westphalian and Prussian statesman.

== Early life ==
Hans Graf von Bülow was born to the noble von Bülow family in 1774 at his family's Essenrode Manor. His father, Friedrich Ernst von Bülow, was an Hanoverian land owner. His older brother, Friedrich Wilhelm August Werner von Bülow, was a lawyer and governor of the Prussian Province of Saxony. Hans was also the cousin of Prussian reformer and former Prime Minister Karl August von Hardenberg.

Hans attended Lüneburg's Knight academy from 1786 to 1790 and studied at the University of Göttingen in Göttingen between 1790 and 1794. Here he became acquainted with the teachings of English economist Adam Smith, which would have a significant influence on his career

== Biography ==
=== Early career ===
After completing his studies in Göttingen, Bülow joined the Prussian service in 1794 with Hardenberg and in 1801 he became a counselor (Kriegs and Domänenrat) in the General Directorate in Berlin for the Magdeburg and Halberstadt department. Bülow was appointed president of the War and Domain Chamber of the Duchy of Magdeburg in 1805. One year later, in 1806, he was appointed head of armaments for the Prussian army. Magdeburg surrendered to France during the Napoleonic Wars in 1806 and in the 1807 Treaty of Tilsit, the city was annexed to the French-controlled Kingdom of Westphalia. After Magdeburg was incorporated into the Kingdom of Westphalia, he returned to his position as president of the War and Domain Chamber, but this time for Westphalia.

=== Finance Minister of Westphalia ===
Between 1808 and 1813, Bülow was the Finance Minister of the Kingdom of Westphalia. Through elaborate methods of keeping Westphalian finances in order, he became very successful and gained a great deal of respect in both Germany and abroad. His methods and successes were very unpopular with influential Germans and the ruling French.

=== Finance Minister of Prussia ===
In 1813, through contacts of Hardenberg, Bülow accepted the same Finance Minister position in Prussia, taking office that year. He wanted taxation reforms, for inland commerce as free trade. The national debt in 1818 was high, however, and it was not possible to reduce taxes. To tackle the debt, he increased in indirect taxes, and ended up hitting the lower class. This created tension between him and his opponents, led by Wilhelm von Humboldt. Ultimately, his opponents, including the notable statistician Johann Gottfried Hoffmann, rejected Bülow's taxes on food and goods in favor of a direct personal tax that increased based on class. By the end of 1817, Bülow resigned in protest over the dropping of his proposals. He was replaced as finance minister by Wilhelm Anton von Klewitz.

=== Commerce Minister of Prussia ===
After leaving the Finance Minister post, Bülow was given the newly created position of Minister of Commerce. He became a pioneer in the field of trade and commerce as he led the customs department. With the Customs Act of 1818, Bülow led the way to eliminate tariffs within Prussia and impose tariffs on commerce entering the country. Despite neighboring countries voicing their opposition and their attempts to have Prussia remove the new policies, they all failed to sway Prussia and eventually this led to the economic supremacy of Prussia. The Customs Act of 1818 led the way for later policies that allowed Prussia to grow economically and financially. To avoid the high tariffs placed on goods, they joined the Prussian state. The addition of territory to the Prussian state made the elimination of customs barriers a powerful factor in Prussian politics. Eventually, these policies helped create a unified Germany.

In 1825, the Commerce Department was dissolved.

=== Senior President of Silesia ===
In early 1825, he became the Oberpräsident (senior president) of the Prussian province of Silesia. He held the position until 10 July when Friedrich Theodor von Merckel replaced him.

== Death and views ==
Hans Graf von Bülow died on 11 August 1825 in Bad Landeck, Silesia, which is located in present day Poland. Bülow was known to take a conservative stance on constitutional policy. He supported the Carlsbad decrees and opposed a representative constitution. On the economy, he had combined his conservative stance with more liberal views, pushing for low tariffs and free trade. Many of Bulow's projects and ideas were actualized years after his death.

== See also ==
- Zollverein
