= Neue Sorge =

Coordinates: 54.7148°N 20.5403°E

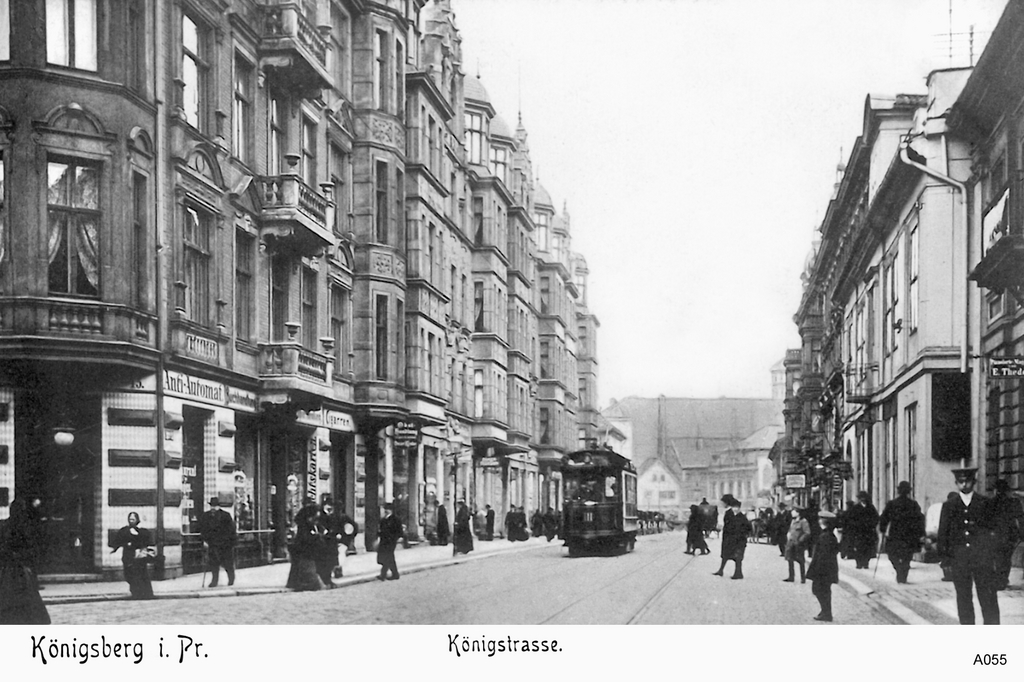
Königstraße

Neue Sorge, also known as Königstraße or Königstrasse after its main boulevard, was a quarter of eastern Königsberg, Germany. Its territory is now part of the Leningradsky District of Kaliningrad, Russia.

== Etymology ==
The original name Neue Sorge was derived from the Old Prussian zarge, meaning enclosed fields, or sarge, meaning sentinel or watchman. In folk etymology, the German language name derived from the response of Bogusław Radziwiłł, 17th century governor of Königsberg, when asked what the developing district should be called: "Wieder eine neue Sorge!" ("Again a new worry!"). The later name Königstraße means "King Street" in German.

== History ==
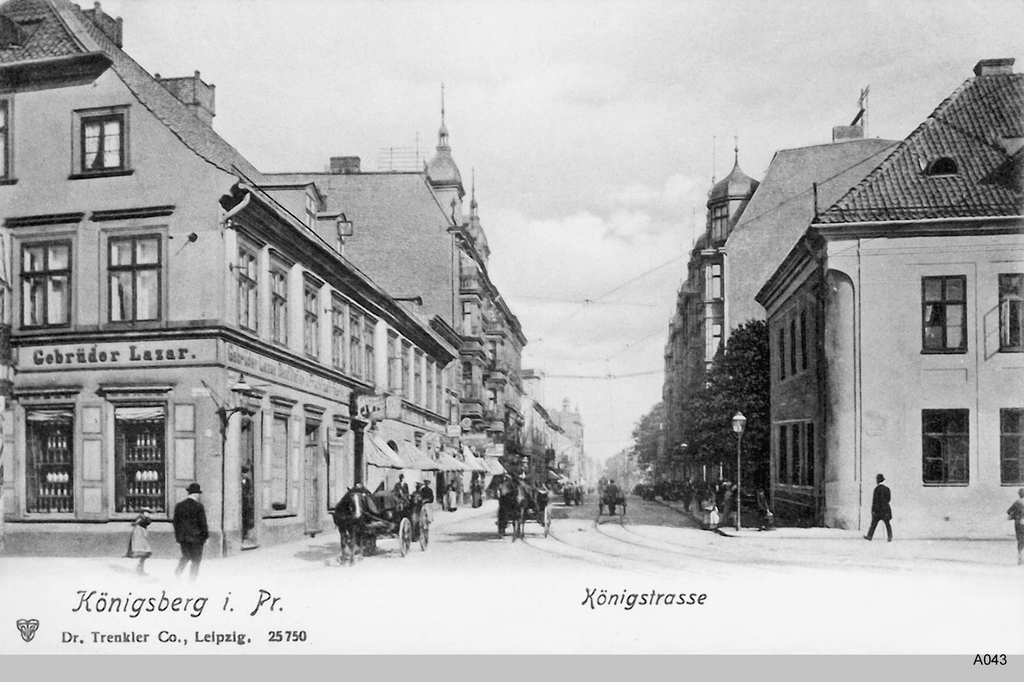
Königstraße

At the start of the ducal era, the pathway led to pastures for cattle and horses known as the Kalthöfischer Acker. Settlement began ca. 1610, and in 1612 fields were granted to numerous high-ranking ducal officials. In 1662 Duke Frederick William, the Great Elector, established Neue Sorge as a Freiheit of Königsberg Castle and bestowed it with a Gerichtssiegel, or court seal. This depicted a hand descending from clouds holding a heraldic right angle, flanked by two open eyes, as well as the 1662 year of its granting.

Neue Sorge was bordered by Löbenicht to the west, Rossgarten to the north, the 17th century Baroque city walls to the east, and Sackheim to the south. The residents of Neue Sorge attended Altrossgarten Church. In 1729 Neue Sorge was documented as Königstraße, a street which ran from Roßgarten's market to a cul-de-sac at King's Gate.

Altstadt, Löbenicht, Kneiphof, and their respective suburbs were merged to form the united city of Königsberg in 1724. However, Königsberg Castle and its suburbs, including Neue Sorge, were included within the new city limits but remained under royal, not municipal, control. Neue Sorge was merged into the city during the Städteordnung of Stein on 19 November 1808 during the era of Prussian reforms.

The boulevard Königstraße was renamed Straße der SA by the Nazi Party during the era of Nazi Germany. The quarter was heavily damaged during the 1944 Bombing of Königsberg and 1945 Battle of Königsberg during World War II.

== Locations ==
Construction of the beautiful Baroque houses of Neue Sorge intensified when the Great Elector granted the land to his court officials for residence. East Prussian noble families who lived in the quarter included the Flanß, Götzen, Goltz, Halle, Kanitz, Kittlitz, Königseck, Lesgewang, Nettelhorst, Öltzen, Ostau, Polenz, Rappe, Röder, Schack von Wittenau, Schlieben, Truchseß, and Wallenrodt.

The commander of the 1st Division resided in the Dönhoffsche Haus (Nr. 26), while Chancellor Karl Gustav von Goßler lived in Nr. 79. The Dasselsche Haus (Nr. 55), once owned by the counts of Eulenburg, was converted into a savings bank in 1936.

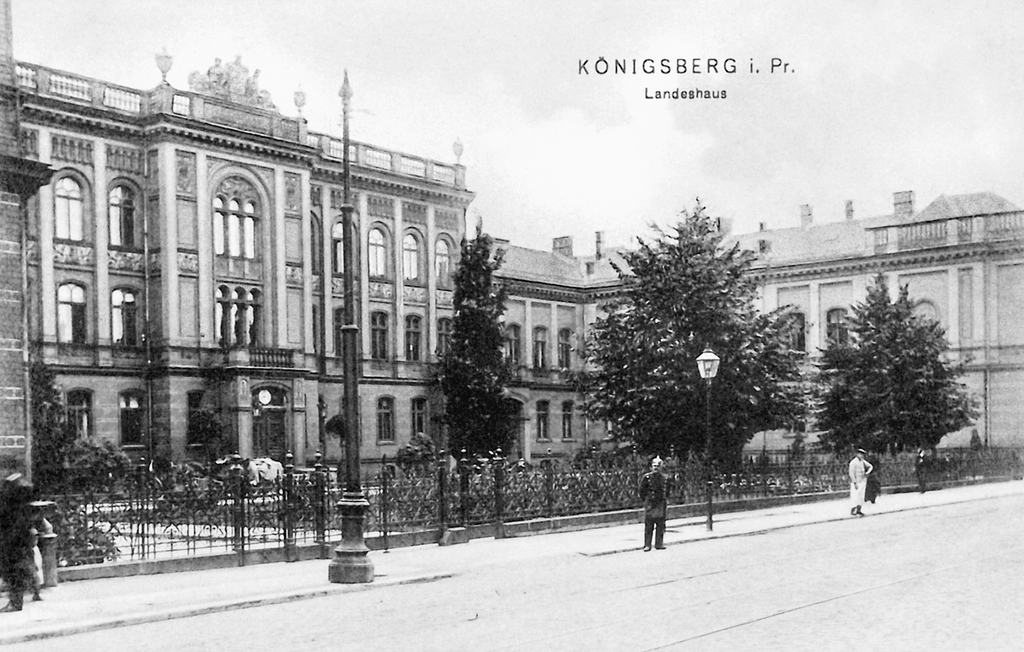
The Landeshaus, seat of the province of East Prussia

Sometime between 1730 and 1732 King Frederick William I purchased the house at Nr. 65-67 for personal use from the widow of Chancellor Ludwig von Ostau; this became known as the Königshaus. King Frederick II established a military college (École militaire) in the Königshaus in 1741, which remained until its transfer to Haberberg in 1799. The royal and university libraries were located in the building from 1810 until 1901, when they moved to Tragheim. It subsequently hosted the university's collection of plaster antiques and the historical society Altertumsgesellschaft Prussia. From 1810 to 1875 it also housed the public library.

The Kunstakademie Königsberg was located along Königstraße from 1841 to 1916, while the French Reformed Church was located on the opposite side of the street. This church, built from 1733 to 1736 according to plans by Joachim Ludwig Schultheiß von Unfried, was used by the city's Huguenot community. Near the Kunstakadamie was an obelisk honoring Theodor von Schön. Also located along Königstraße was the Friedenskirche.

The Landeshaus, the administrative seat of government for the province of East Prussia, was located at Königstraße 28–31 on lands once owned by the Dönhoff family. The three-story building was built in 1878 according to plans by the government architect CWG Krah and subsequently expanded thrice. It contained frescoes by Otto Brausewetter and Ludwig Noster. The Königin-Luise-Schule was located on Landhofmeisterstraße near Sackheim, while the Bessel-Oberrealschule was found on Glaserstraße near Löbenicht and Roßgärter Markt. The Goethe-Oberlyzeum was found on Friedrichstraße.
