= Goethe-Oberlyzeum =

- Friedrichstraße, Königsberg; Germany

Information
- Type: Girls' gymnasium
- Established: 1913

The Goethe-Oberlyzeum was a girls' gymnasium in Königsberg, Germany, named in honor of the writer Johann Wolfgang von Goethe.

== History ==
In 1913 a women's teaching institute (Lehrerinnenbildungsanstalt) was converted into a gymnasium. Fritz Gause began lecturing there in 1922. The school, which was located on Friedrichstraße in Neue Sorge, was acquired by the city of Königsberg in 1925. Its directors included Bruno Dannenbaum and Richard Scheibe. The building survived Bombing of Königsberg in World War II and was razed in January 2018, under protest from presidential candidate Ksenia Sobchak and other conservationists, in Kaliningrad, Russia.
