= Portrait of Karl von Hardenberg =

1818 painting by Thomas Lawrence

Portrait of Karl August von Hardenberg
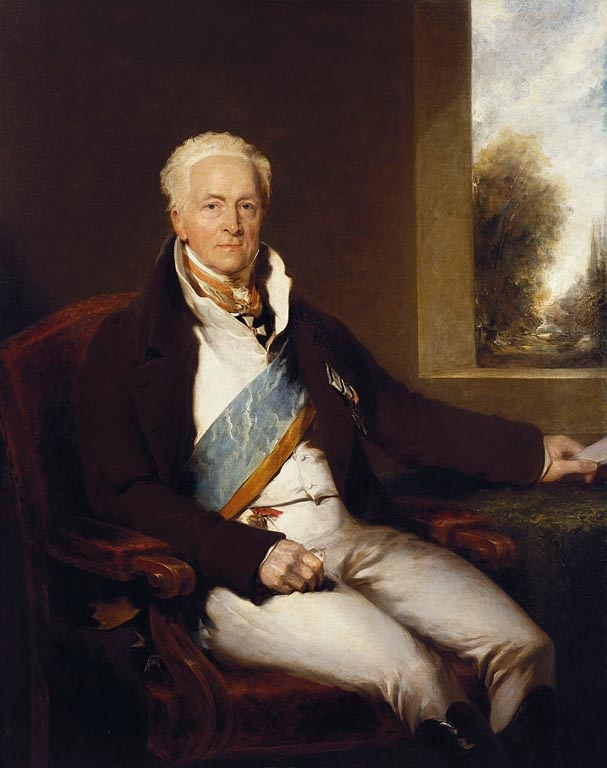
- Artist: Thomas Lawrence
- Year: 1818
- Type: Oil on canvas, portrait painting
- Dimensions: 142.6 cm × 113 cm (56.1 in × 44 in)
- Location: Royal Collection; Windsor Castle

Portrait of Karl von Hardenberg is an 1818 portrait painting by the British artist Thomas Lawrence. It depicts the German statesman Karl August von Hardenberg, noted for his service as Prime Minister of Prussia during the Napoleonic era. He was a key figure in the Prussian Reforms and represented Prussia at the Congress of Vienna and other major gatherings of the Concert of Europe. He is shown seated at a table, spectacles in hand, wearing decorations of the Iron Cross of Prussia and the Order of the Black Eagle.

Lawrence received 300 guineas for the work from the Prince Regent, the future George IV. It was part of a large-scale commission to paint the leading figures of the Sixth Coalition which had defeated Napoleon. He produced it while attending the Congress of Aix-la-Chapelle in 1818, where Hardenberg was representing Prussia in discussions about ending the Allied Occupation of France. It remained in Lawrence's London studio at his death in 1830, before being transferred to the Waterloo Chamber at Windsor Castle.

== Bibliography ==
- Albinson, Cassandra, Funnell, Peter & Peltz, Lucy. Thomas Lawrence: Regency Power and Brilliance. Yale University Press, 2010.
- Goldring, Douglas. Regency Portrait Painter: The Life of Sir Thomas Lawrence. Macdonald, 1951.
- Levey, Michael. Sir Thomas Lawrence. Yale University Press, 2005.
- Millar, Oliver. The Later Georgian Pictures in the Collection of Her Majesty the Queen. Phaidon, 1969
- Thielen, Peter Gerrit. Karl August von Hardenberg 1750-1822: Eine Biographie. Grote, 1967.
