= Königin-Luise-Schule =

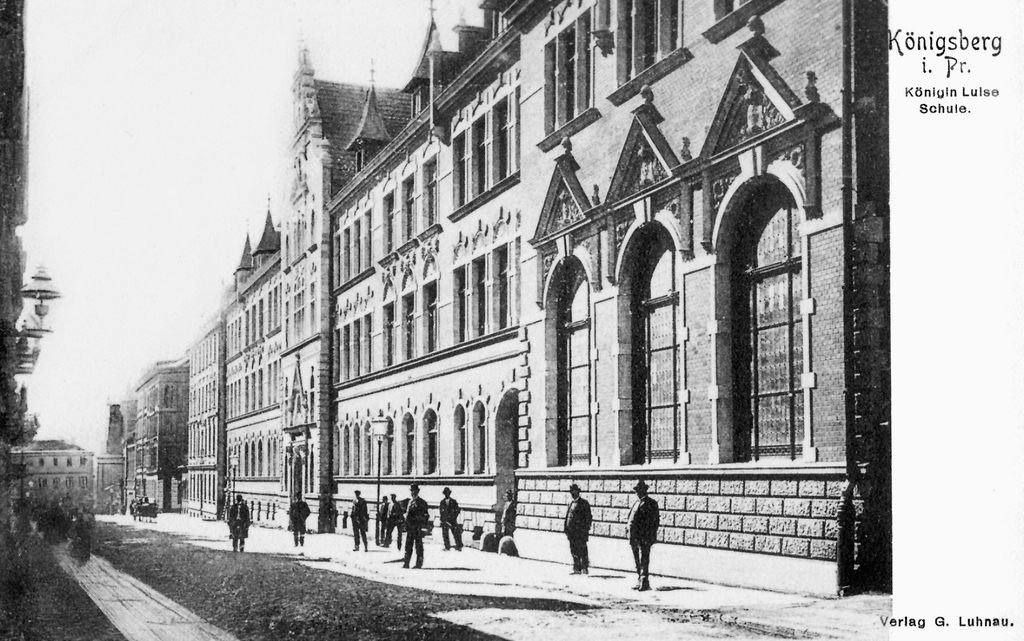
Königin-Luise-Schule

The Königin-Luise-Schule or Luisenschule was a girls' gymnasium in Königsberg, Germany.

== History ==
Superintendent Johann G. Weiß opened a private school for girls on Brodbänkenstraße in Kneiphof in 1811, but it was acquired by the city government six years later. At that time, the school was relocated to a former boarding house for the poor on Danziger Keller in Altstadt, near Königsberg Castle. In 1867, the school, then known as the Sautersche Schule, moved into the building formerly used by Kneiphof Gymnasium, near Königsberg Cathedral.

The school moved to a new building on Landhofmeisterstraße between Sackheim and Neue Sorge in 1901 and was renamed the Königin-Luise-Schule, after Queen Louise of Prussia (1776–1810). The new structure replaced a house whose former occupants included the queen and the Landhofmeister Johann Ernst von Wallenrodt (1615-1697) and Friedrich Gottfried von der Groeben (1726–1799).

In 1907 the Königin-Luise-Schule was reorganized into a Realgymnasium. In 1913, the Oberlyzeum and Frauenschule separated from the Königin-Luise-Schule and formed a new institution for the training of female teachers on Friedrichstraße. In 1936, the Königin-Luise-Schule was decorated with a bust of Paul von Hindenburg by Elisabeth Kleinschmidt. It ceased its role as a German gymnasium in 1945 as a result of World War II and the evacuation and ethnic cleansing of East Prussia. The building is now used as a middle school, serving the present Russian population of what has become Kaliningrad, Russia.

== Directors ==
- Julius Leopold Sauter (1841)
- Karl Heinrich (1884)
- Hermann Jantzen (1905)
- Eduard Loch (1913)
- Erhard Roß (1933-1945)
