= Heinrich Friedrich Karl vom und zum Stein =

Prussian statesman (1757-1831)

- Reichsfreiherr
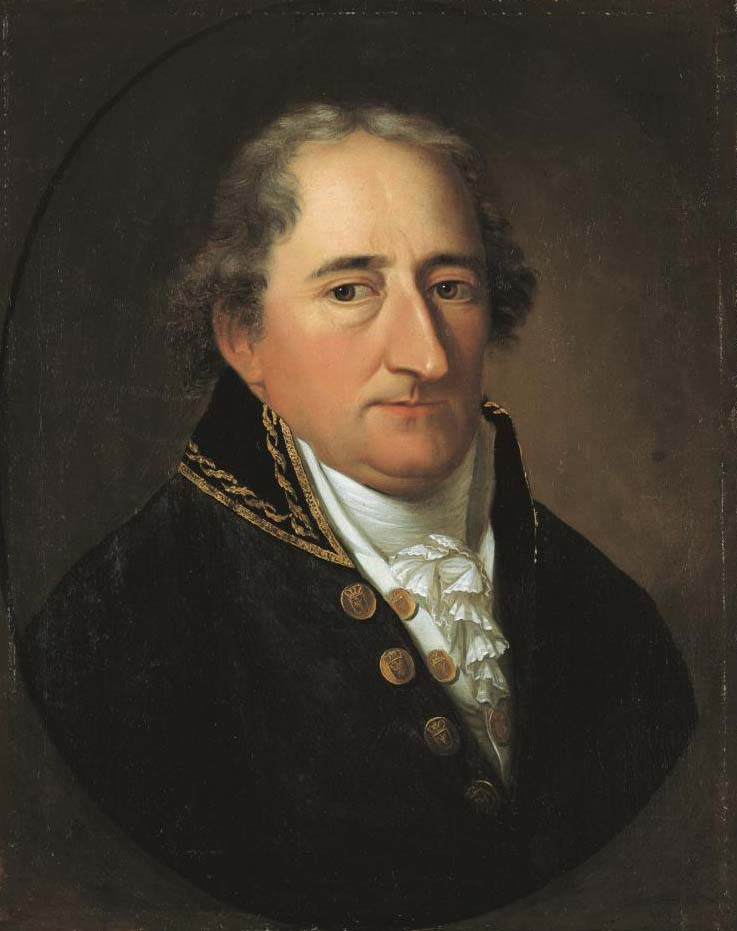
- Heinrich Friedrich Karl Reichsfreiherr vom und zum Stein (painting by Johann Christoph Rincklake)
- Born: 25 October 1757; Nassau, County of Nassau, Holy Roman Empire
- Died: 29 June 1831 (aged 73); Cappenberg Castle, Province of Westphalia, Kingdom of Prussia
- Occupation: Politician; Minister

Heinrich Friedrich Karl vom und zum Stein (25 October 1757 – 29 June 1831), commonly known as Baron vom Stein, was a Prussian statesman who introduced the Prussian reforms, which paved the way for the unification of Germany. He promoted the abolition of serfdom, with indemnification to territorial lords; subjection of the nobles to manorial imposts; and the establishment of a modern municipal system.

Stein was from an old Franconian family. He was born on the family estate near Nassau, studied at Göttingen, and entered the civil service. Prussian conservatism hampered him in his efforts to bring about changes. In 1807, he was removed from office by the King for refusing to accept the post of Minister of Foreign Affairs but was recalled after the Peace of Tilsit.

After it became known that he had written a letter in which he criticised Napoleon, Stein was obliged to resign, which he did on 24 November 1808 and retired to the Austrian Empire, from which he was summoned to the Russian Empire by Tsar Alexander I in 1812. After the Battle of Leipzig in 1813, Stein became head of the council for the administration of the reconquered German countries.

== Early life ==
Stein was the ninth child of Karl Philipp Freiherr vom Stein, and Henriette Karoline Langwerth von Simmern. Stein is the descendant of an ancient imperial family. Like many of his generation, he greatly admired Frederick the Great.

In his old age, Stein would express his gratitude to his parents for the influence. He added:

My view of the world and of human affairs I gathered as a boy and youth, in the solitude of a country life, from ancient and modern history, and in particular I was attracted by the incidents of the eventful history of England.

== Education ==
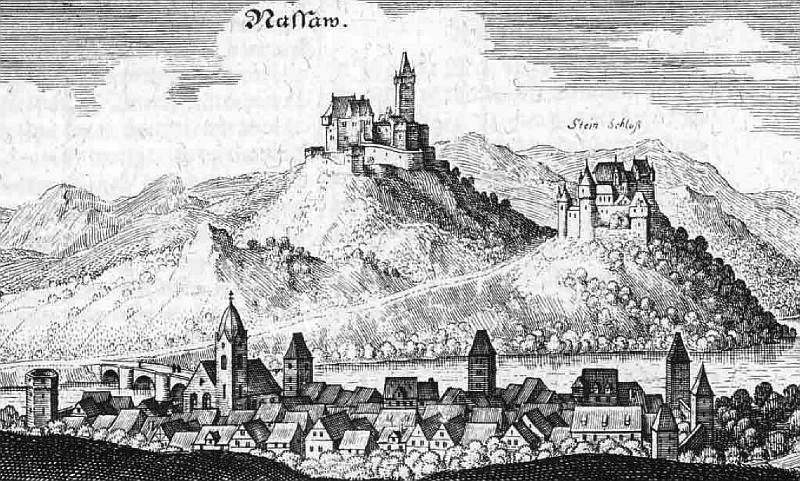
The town of Nassau with the castle and family seat of the Stein family, copper engraving by Matthäus Merian 1655

In 1773 Stein went to the University of Göttingen to study jurisprudence. He also found time to pursue his studies in English history and politics.

In 1777 Stein left Göttingen and proceeded to Wetzlar, the legal centre of the Holy Roman Empire. He observed the workings of its institutions and prepare himself for a career in law. Next, after a stay at each of the chief south German cities, he settled at Regensburg to observe the methods of the Imperial Diet. In 1779 he went to Vienna. He proceeded to Berlin early in 1780.

== Career in Prussia ==
In Berlin, his admiration for Frederick the Great, together with his distaste for the pettiness of the legal procedure at Wetzlar, compelled him to take service in the monarchy of Prussia. He gained a position in the department of mines and manufactures. At the head of that department was Friedrich Anton von Heynitz who was a master of economics and civil government. In June 1785, Stein was sent for a time as Prussian ambassador to the courts of Mainz, Zweibrücken, and Darmstadt. Between 1786 and 1787, Stein went on a tour in England where he pursued his research into commercial and mining affairs.

=== Directorship ===
In November 1787, Stein was appointed Kammerdirektor, director of the chamber of war and domains, for the king's possessions west of the river Weser. From 1796 until 1803, he was supreme president of all the Westphalian chambers dealing with the commerce and mines of Prussian lands with a seat in Minden. One of the chief benefits he conferred on these districts was the canalization of the river Ruhr which became an important outlet for the coal of that region. He also improved the navigation of the Weser.

=== War with France ===
Stein's early training and his stern practical mentality made him completely impervious to the enthusiasm that his contemporaries had shown for the French Revolution. He disliked the methods of the revolutionaries which he saw as an interruption to the orderly development of peoples. Nevertheless, he carefully noted the new sources of national strength that arrose from reforms in France.

After being at war with France in 1792 to 1795, Prussia came to terms with the new revolutionary government in France at Basel in April 1795. The two nations remained at peace until 1806. However, Austria and southern Germany continued the struggle against France for most of that time. In Prussia, Frederick William III succeeded Frederick William II in November 1797. Unfortunately, Frederick William III listened to the advice of secret and irresponsible counsellors and persisted to undermine the Peace of Basle.

=== Minister of State ===
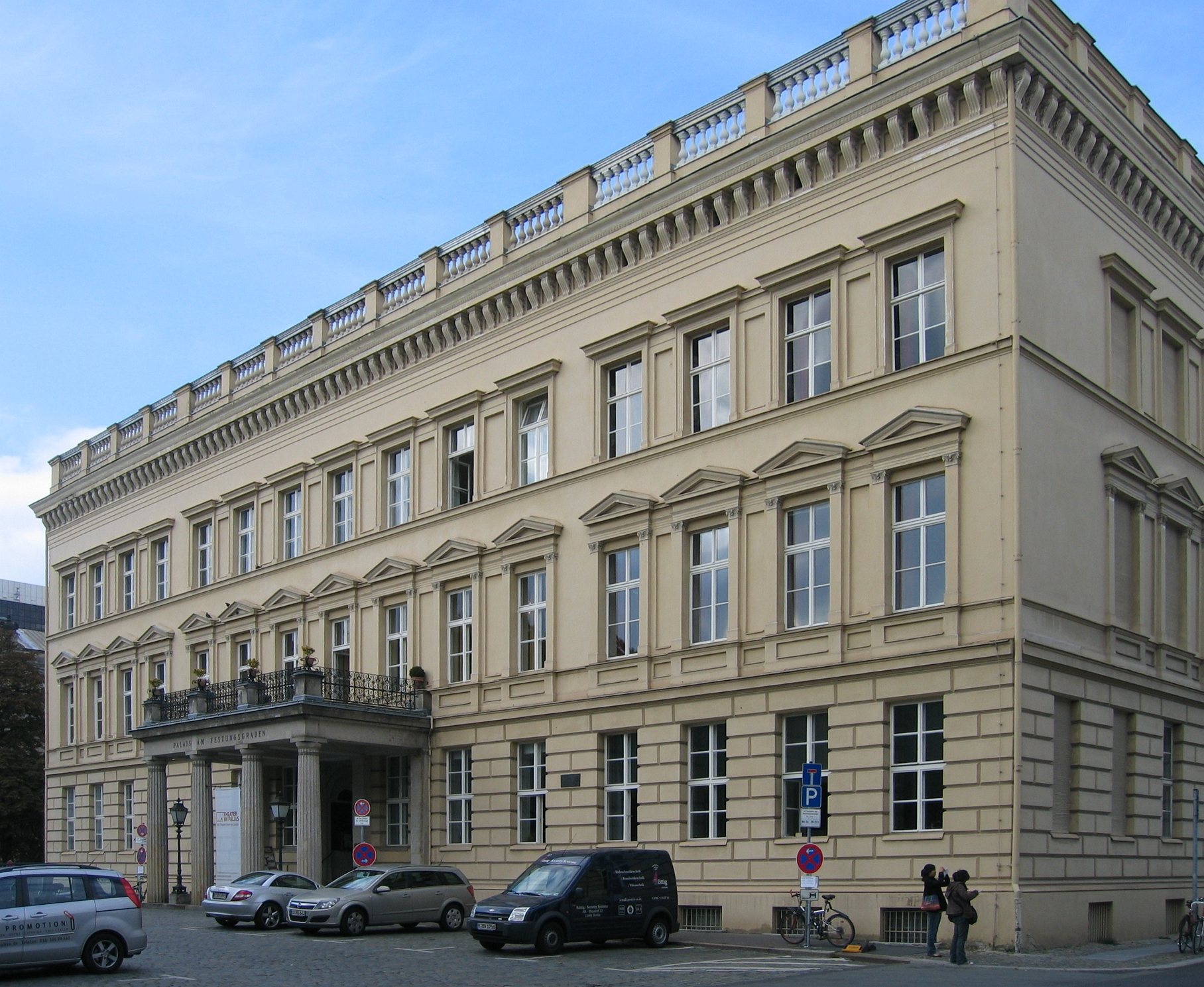
The Donnersches Palais (today Palais am Festungsgraben), Stein's residence as a Prussian Minister

Stein in 1804 took office as minister of state for trade in Prussia. This made him responsible for indirect imposts, taxes, manufactures, and commerce. While in office he introduced useful reforms in his department, particularly by abolishing various restrictions on the internal trade of the nation, but he was hampered in his endeavors by the spirit of Prussian conservatism. Stein was not at ease with the effects of the Francophile policy by the chief minister Christian Graf von Haugwitz. Little came of Stein's protests, but he continued to protest. Prussian policy continued to progress on the path that led to the disaster at Battle of Jena starting on 14 October 1806.

Stein was offered the portfolio for foreign affairs, which Stein declined to accept on the ground of his incompetence to manage that department unless there was a complete change in the system of government. Stein desired for Karl August von Hardenberg to take that office and bring into effect, with Stein's own help, the necessary administrative changes. The Prussian king refused to accept Hardenberg and, greatly irritated by Stein's unusually outspoken letters, dismissed Stein altogether because he was "a refractory, insolent, obstinate and disobedient official". Stein spent the months in which Napoleon completed the ruin of Prussia in retirement.

=== Treaty of Tilsit ===
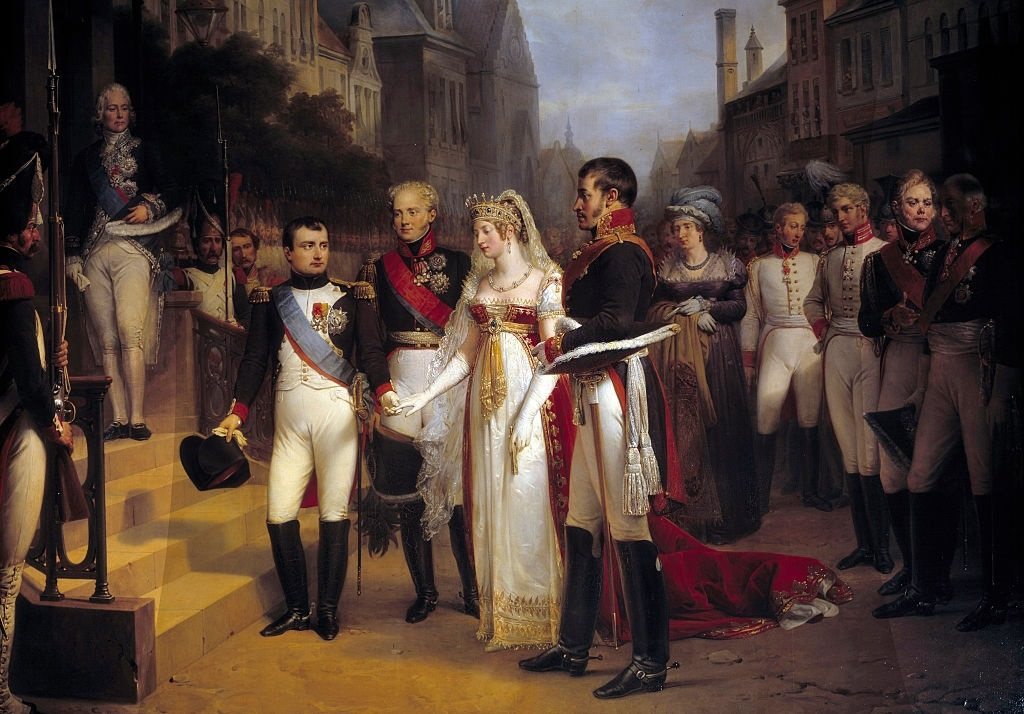
Napoleon, Alexander I of Russia, Queen Louise of Prussia, and Frederick William III in Tilsit

Stein got to see Karl August von Hardenberg who had been called to office in April 1807. Important reforms were effected in the cabinet system. During the negotiations at Tilsit, Napoleon refused to act upon Hardenberg's recommendations and Hardenberg thereupon retired. Surprisingly, Napoleon, who had as yet no idea of Stein's deep and earnest patriotism, suggested Stein as a possible successor. No other strong man was at hand who could save the ship of state, and on 8 October 1807 Frederick William III of Prussia, utterly depressed by the terrible terms of the Treaty of Tilsit, called Stein to office and entrusted him with very wide powers.

=== Prussian reforms ===
Stein was now for a time virtually dictator of the reduced and nearly-bankrupt Prussian state. The circumstances of the time and his own convictions, gained from study and experience, led him to press on drastic reforms in a way that could not otherwise have been followed.

First came the October Edict, issued at Memel on 9 October 1807, which abolished the institution of serfdom throughout Prussia from 8 October 1810. Karl August von Hardenberg supported the October Edict. At the heart of the reform efforts was the conviction that the Prussian state could be reinvigorated if the most talented people in Prussia's society were actively involved in the work of government. In June 1807 Stein expanded on this thesis in the Nassauer Denkschrift. Stein in December 1807 wrote to Hardenberg, contemplating that it "is essential that the nation become accustomed to managing its own affairs, so that it will emerge from this state of infancy in which an anxious and officious government attempts to keep the people".

All distinctions affecting the land tenure, including land owned by the nobility and peasants' land, were swept away and the principle of free trade in land was established. The October Edict also abrogated all class distinctions respecting occupations and callings of any and every kind, thus striking another blow at the caste system that had been so rigorous in Prussia.

Stein's next step was to strengthen the cabinet by wise changes.

Stein issued a measure for municipal reform on 19 November 1808 which granted local self-government on enlightened yet practical lines to all Prussian towns and even to all villages possessing more than 800 inhabitants.

While Stein's efforts were directed more towards civil affairs, he also furthered the progress of the military reforms, which are connected more especially with the name of Gerhard Johann David von Scharnhorst. They refashioned the Prussian army on modern lines, with a reserve system. Military service was made obligatory for all classes.

== Exile ==
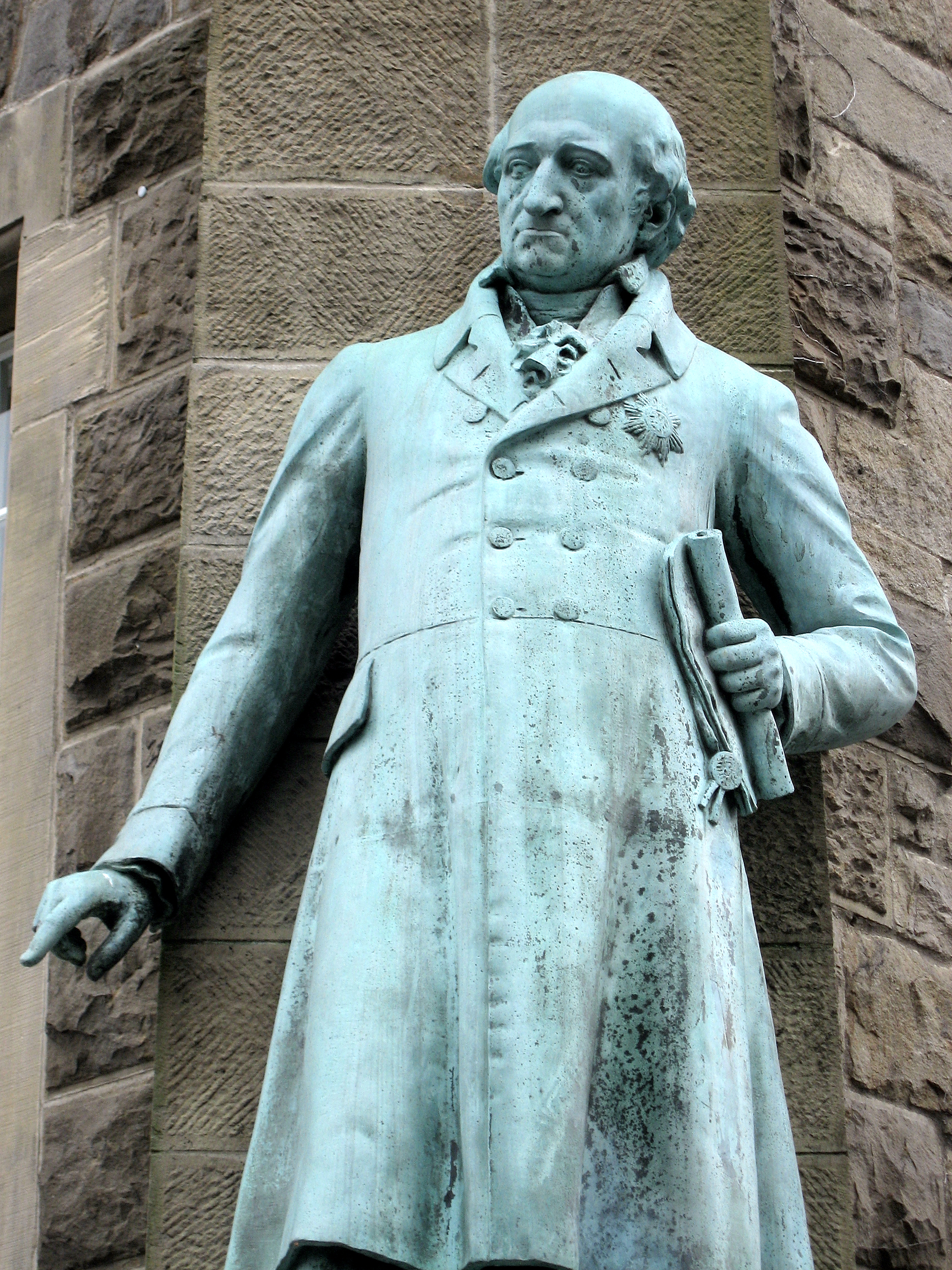
Statue of von Stein at the town hall in Wetter (Ruhr), North Rhine-Westphalia

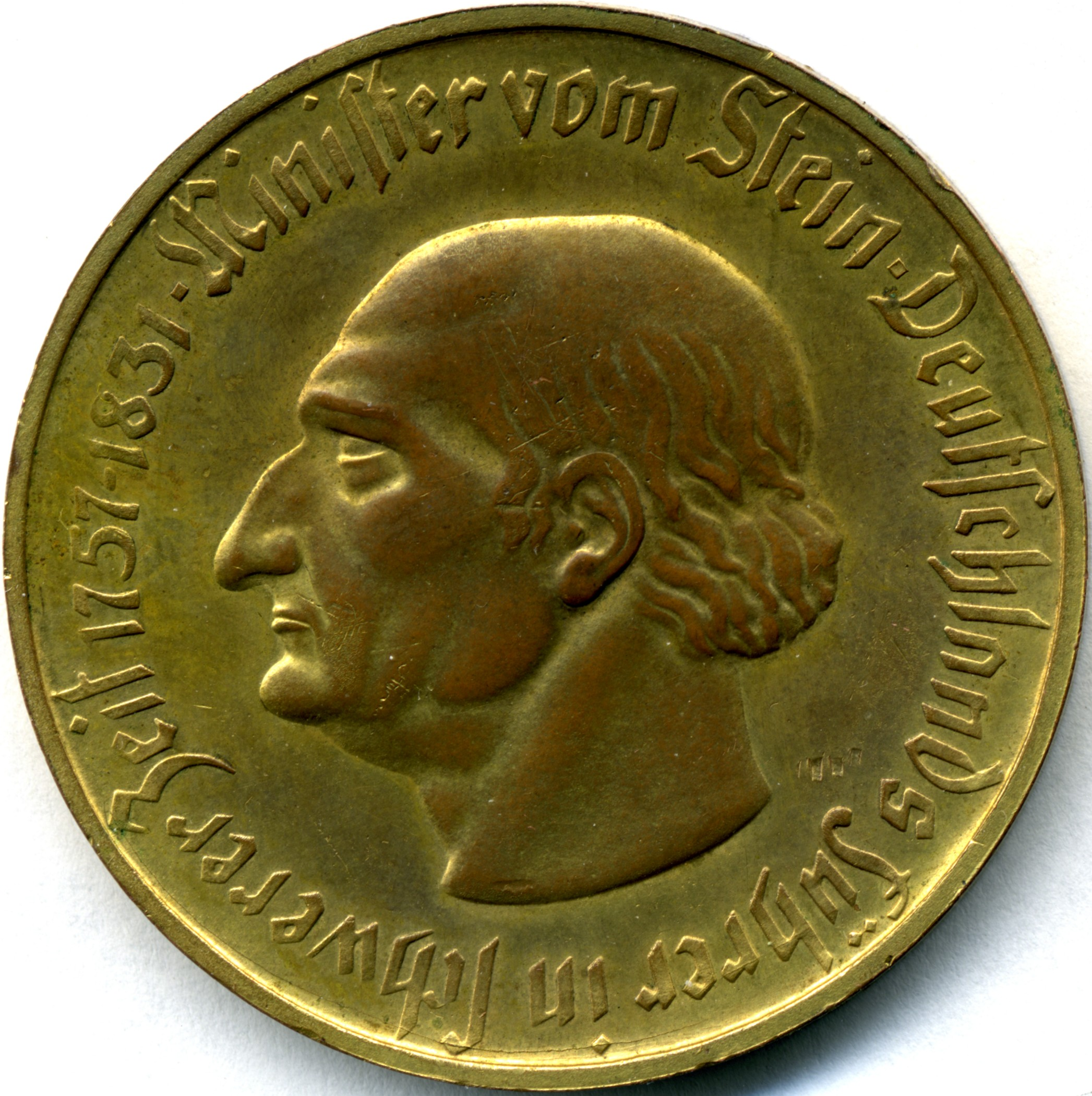
A 1923 5 million mark coin with Vom Stein's likeness from the era of hyperinflation in the Weimar Republic

Shortly afterwards, the reformer had to flee from Prussia. In August 1808, the French agents, who swarmed throughout the land, had seized one of his letters, in which he spoke of his hope that Germany would soon be ready for a national rising like that of Spain. On 10 September, Napoleon gave orders that Stein's property in the new kingdom of Westphalia should be confiscated, and he likewise put pressure on Frederick William to dismiss him. The king evaded compliance, but the French emperor, on entering Madrid in triumph, declared (16 December) Stein to be an enemy of France and the Confederation of the Rhine and ordered the confiscation of all his property in the Confederation. Stein saw that his life was in danger and fled from Berlin (5 January 1809). Thanks to the help of his former colleague, Count Friedrich Wilhelm von Reden, who gave him an asylum in his castle in the Riesengebirge, he succeeded in crossing the frontier into Bohemia.

For three years, Stein lived in the Austrian Empire, generally at Brno, but in May 1812, in danger of being surrendered by Austria to Napoleon, he received an invitation to visit Saint Petersburg from Emperor Alexander I of Russia, who saw that Austria was certain to be on the side of France in the forthcoming Franco-Russian War. At the crisis of that struggle, Stein may have been one of the influences that kept the tsar determined never to treat with Napoleon. When the miserable remains of the Grand Army reeled back into Prussia at the close of the year, Stein urged the Russian emperor to go on and free Europe from the French domination.

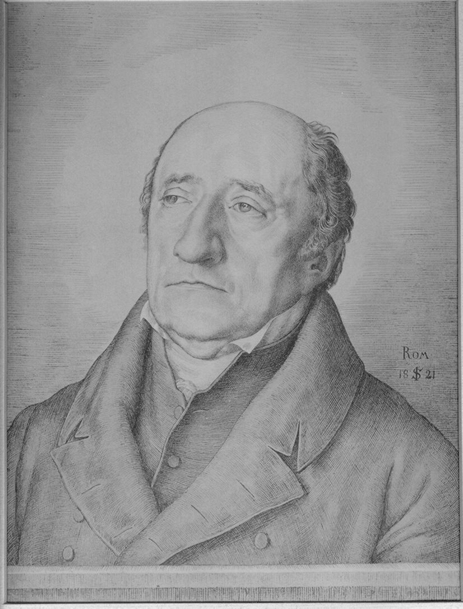
Freiherr von und zum Stein 1821

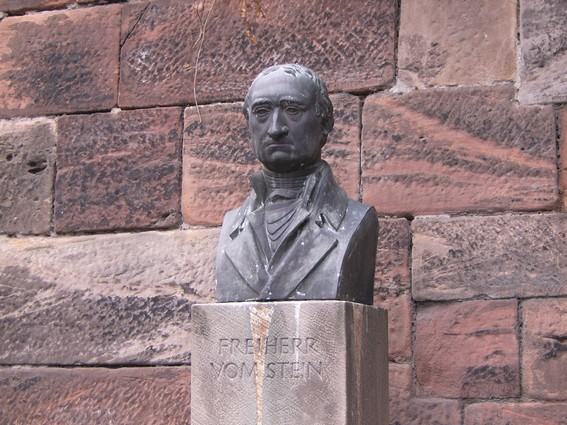
Bust of von Stein in front of the old University of Marburg

Events now brought Stein rapidly to the front. On 30 December 1812, the Prussian general Ludwig Yorck von Wartenburg signed the Convention of Tauroggen with the Russian general Hans Karl von Diebitsch for neutralization of the Prussian corps at and near Tilsit and for the free passage of the Russians through that part of the king's dominions. The Russian emperor requested Stein to act as provisional administrator of the provinces of East and West Prussia. In that capacity, he convened an assembly of representatives of the local estates, which on 5 February 1813, ordered the establishment of a militia (Landwehr), a militia reserve and a final levy (Landsturm).

The energy that Stein infused into all around him contributed not a little to this important decision, which pushed on the king's government to more decided action than then seemed possible. Stein now went to Breslau, to where the King of Prussia had proceeded, but the annoyance that Frederick William felt at his irregular action lessened his influence.

The 1813 Treaty of Kalisz between Russia and Prussia cannot be claimed as due to Stein's actions, which were reprehended in court circles as those of a fanatic. At that time, the great patriot fell ill of a fever and complained of total neglect by the king and court.

He recovered, however, in time to take part in the drafting of a Russo-Prussian convention (19 March 1813) respecting the administration of the districts that should be delivered from French occupation. During the varying phases of the campaign of 1813 Stein continued to urge the need of war à outrance against Napoleon.

The Allies, after the entry of England and Austria into the coalition, conferred on Stein the important duties of superintending the administration of the liberated territories. After the Battle of Leipzig (16–19 October 1813), Stein entered that city the day after its occupation by the Allies and thus expressed his feelings on the fall of Napoleon's domination:

There it lies, then, the monstrous fabric cemented by the blood and tears of so many millions and reared by an insane and accursed tyranny. From one end of Germany to the other we may venture to say aloud that Napoleon is a villain and the enemy of the human race.

Stein wanted to see Germany reconstituted as a nation but was frustrated by Austrian diplomat Prince Klemens Wenzel von Metternich, who gained the alliance of the rulers of south and central Germany for his empire, on the understanding that they were to retain their old powers. Austria and the secondary German states resisted all unifying proposals, and Stein blamed the Prussian chancellor Hardenberg for vacillation.

Stein shared in the desire of Prussian statesmen to absorb Saxony; in that too, he was doomed to disappointment. On 24 May 1815, he sent to his patron, the emperor Alexander, a detailed criticism of the federal arrangements proposed for Germany. He retired after the Congress of Vienna and disliked the postponement of the representative system of government that Frederick William had promised to Prussia in May 1815.

== Later life ==
His chief interest was in the study of history, and from 1818 to 1820, he worked hard to establish the society for the encouragement of historical research and the publication of the Monumenta Germaniae historica, of which his future biographer, Georg Heinrich Pertz, became the director.

Stein died at Schloss Cappenberg in Westphalia on 29 June 1831. His burial ground is in the city of Bad Ems near Koblenz.

Research has shown that Stein's credit for originating many of the far-reaching reforms of 1807/8 must be shared with Theodor von Schön and many others. A popular legend named him as the founder of the Tugendbund, an institution that he always distrusted.

Stein's enlightenment, insight into the needs of the time, and energy gave momentum to the reform movement.

== Marriage and issue ==
On 8 June 1793 he married the Countess Wilhelmine Magdalene von Wallmoden (22 June 1772 – 15 September 1819), daughter of Johann Ludwig von Wallmoden-Gimborn, an illegitimate son of King George II of Great Britain. They had three daughters, including Henriette Luise (2 August 1796 – 11 October 1855).

== Sources ==
- Lord Acton (1907), Ward, Sir Adolphus William; Prothero, George Walter; Leathes, Sir Stanley Mordaunt (eds.), The Cambridge modern history, vol. 9, Cambridge: University Press, ISBN 9780521078146
- Rines, George Edwin, ed. (1920). "Stein, Heinrich Friedrich Karl" . Encyclopedia Americana.
- Seeley, Sir John Robert (1969), "Stein and the Tugendbund", Life and times of Stein: or, Germany and Prussia in the Napoleonic age, vol. 1, CUP Archive
