= Essenrode Manor =

Baroque mansion in Lehre, Lower Saxony

- Herrenhaus Essenrode
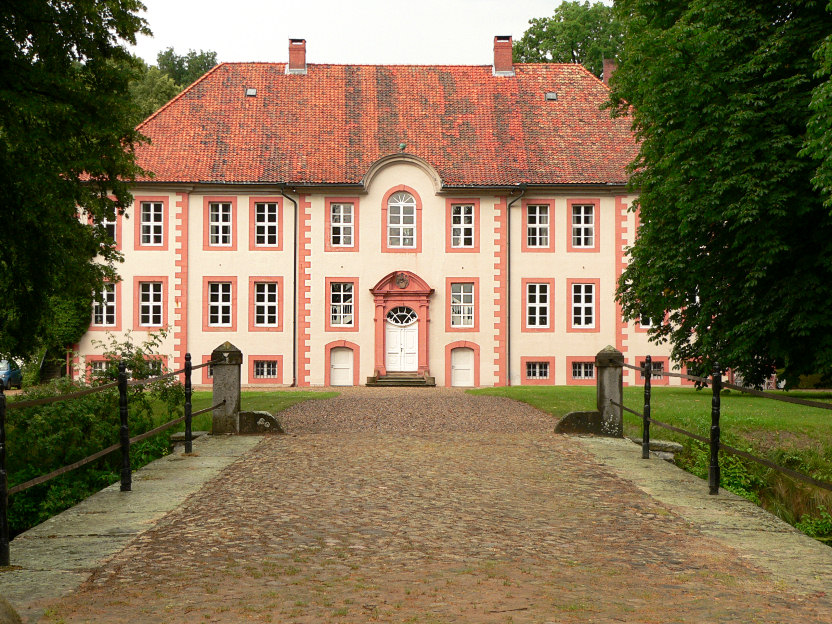
- Essenrode Manor, front view

- Location within Lower Saxony Location within Germany

General information
- Status: Still standing
- Architectural style: Baroque
- Location: Essenrode, Germany
- Coordinates: 52.371517°N 10.635290°E
- Completed: 1738
- Owner: von Lüneburg family

The Essenrode Manor in Essenrode, a town within the municipality of Lehre, Lower Saxony, was built by Gotthart Heinrich August von Bülow in 1738.

== Description ==
The mansion is built in a late Baroque style surrounded by a small English-style park. The park grounds are surrounded by a moat that once included a drawbridge, which was part of earlier fortifications built in 1337. To provide extra protection, these fortifications were constructed and surrounded by outbuildings.

== History ==
The property has been owned by three different families throughout its history. From 1337 to 1625 it was owned by the von Garssenbüttel family.

In 1627, ownership was transferred to the aristocratic family von Bülow, who controlled the property for the next 210 years (1627 to 1837). The von Bulow's built the current mansion as it is today. Former Prussian, Kingdom of Westphalia and Duchy of Magdeburg politician, Hans, Count von Bülow, was born here in 1774. In 1750, Karl August von Hardenberg, Prussian reformer and Minister President of Prussia, whose mother was a von Bülow, was born in the mansion. Karl spent much of his childhood at the mansion and it's during this time that many of his future reforms were developed.

Since 1837 it has belonged to the Lower Saxon noble family von Lüneburg, bastard descendants of the House of Welf (descending from Augustus the Elder, Duke of Brunswick-Lüneburg).

== Literature ==
- Hans Adolf Schultz: Burgen, Schlösser und Herrensitze im Raum Gifhorn-Wolfsburg. Gifhorn 1985
