= Bessel-Oberrealschule =

Defunct secondary school in Könisberg, Germany

Information
- Established: 1865
- Closed: 1945

The Bessel-Oberrealschule was an Oberrealschule in Königsberg, Germany.

== History ==
The school was founded on 16 October 1865 as a Mittelschule, the Löbenichtische Bürgerschule, on Mittelanger in Löbenicht. Its first headmaster was Julius Erdmann, who served until 1893. It was elevated to be the Löbenichtische höhere Bürgerschule in 1880 and the Löbenichtische Realschule or Städtische Realschule in 1902. It moved to a new building on Glaserstraße near Königstraße in 1903. Professor Otto Portzehl headed the school from 1907, when it was converted into a municipal Oberrealschule. It was named after astronomer Friedrich Wilhelm Bessel in 1921. The building survived World War II and is now used as a music school in Kaliningrad, Russia.
