= Friedenskirche, Königsberg =

Former church in Kaliningrad, Russia

Coordinates: 54.7120°N 20.5317°E

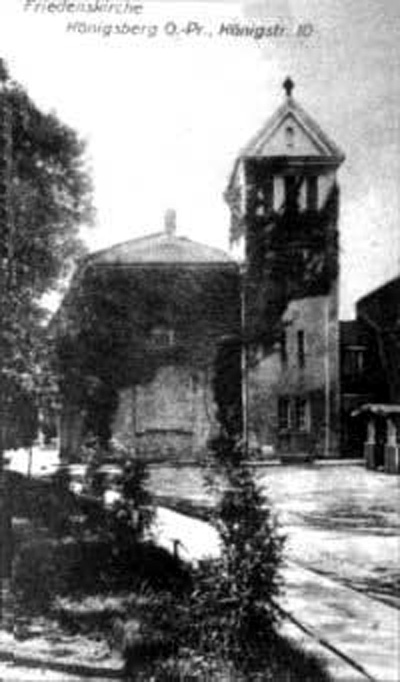
Königsberg's Friedenskirche

The Friedenskirche (Peace Church) was a Protestant church in eastern Königsberg, Germany.

The church was opened on 26 June 1913 along Königstraße. Originally subordinated to Altrossgarten Church, it became an independent parish in 1924. The church was also colloquially known as the Hofkirche because it stood in a garden. Its pastors included H. Federmann and Ernst Czygan. The church was heavily damaged during the 1945 Battle of Königsberg and then demolished by the Soviet administration in Kaliningrad during the 1960s.
