= Karl August von Hardenberg =

Prussian statesman (1750–1822)

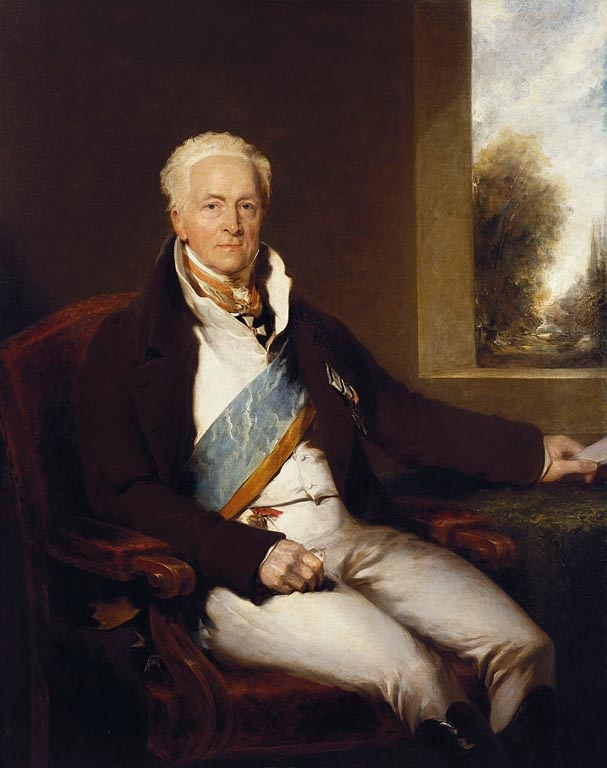
- Portrait of Karl von Hardenberg by Sir Thomas Lawrence, 1818

Prime Minister of Prussia
- In office 14 April 1804 – 1806
- Preceded by: Count Haugwitz
- Succeeded by: Count Haugwitz
- In office April – July 1807
- Preceded by: Karl von Beyme
- Succeeded by: Baron Stein
- In office 6 June 1810 – 26 November 1822
- Preceded by: Count Dohna-Schlobitten
- Succeeded by: Otto von Voß

2nd Interior Minister of Prussia
- In office 1810–1814
- Preceded by: Count Dohna-Schlobitten
- Succeeded by: Count Schuckmann

Personal details
- Born: Karl August Fürst von Hardenberg; 31 May 1750 Essenrode Manor, Electorate of Hanover, Holy Roman Empire
- Died: 26 November 1822 (aged 72) Genoa, Kingdom of Sardinia
- Spouses: Christiane von Reventlow; (m. 1774-div. 1782)
- Children: 2 (including Lucie)
- Parents: Christian Ludwig von Hardenberg (father); Anna Sophia Ehrengart von Bülow (mother)
- Known for: Being a part of the Prussian Reform Movement

Karl August Fürst von Hardenberg (31 May 1750, in Essenrode-Lehre – 26 November 1822, in Genoa) was a Prussian statesman and Chief Minister of Prussia. While during his late career he acquiesced to reactionary policies, earlier in his career he implemented a variety of Liberal reforms. He and Baron vom Stein were together responsible for improvements in Prussia's army system, the abolition of serfdom and feudal burdens, opening the civil service to all classes, and the complete reform of the educational system.

== Family ==
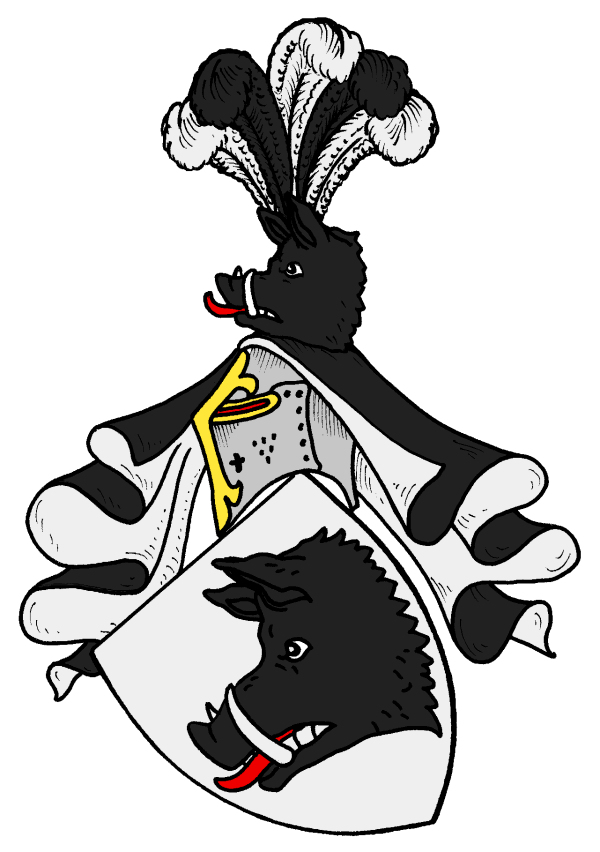
Coat-of-arms of the Hardenberg family

Hardenberg was the eldest son of Christian Ludwig von Hardenberg (1700-1781), a Hanoverian colonel, later to become field marshal and commander-in-chief of the Hanoverian Army under Elector George III from 1776 until his death. His mother was Anna Sophia Ehrengart von Bülow. He was born, one of eight children, at Essenrode Manor near Hanover in the Electorate of Hanover, his maternal grandfather's estate.The ancestral home of the knights of Hardenberg is Hardenberg Castle at Nörten-Hardenberg, which the family acquired in 1287 and owns to this day. They were created barons and, in 1778, counts.

== Career ==
After studying at Leipzig and Göttingen, he entered the Hanoverian civil service in 1770 as councillor of the board of domains (Kammerrat). But, finding his advancement slow, he set out, on the advice of George III, on a series of travels. He spent some time in Wetzlar, the seat of the Imperial Supreme Court (Reichskammergericht). In Regensburg he studied the mechanism of the Holy Roman Empire imperial government. He also visited Vienna and Berlin. Hardenberg visited France, the Dutch Republic, and the Kingdom of Great Britain, where he was received kindly by the King, who was also Elector of Hanover. On his return, Hardenberg married, at his father's suggestion, the Countess Christiane von Reventlow (1759-1793) in 1774. They had a son, Christian Heinrich August Graf von Hardenberg-Reventlow (1775-1841), and a daughter, Lucie von Hardenberg-Reventlow (1776-1854).

In 1778, Hardenberg was raised to the rank of privy councillor and created a graf (or count). He went back to England in the hope of obtaining the post of Hanoverian envoy in London. But his wife began an affair with the Prince of Wales, which created so great a scandal that he was forced to leave the Hanoverian service. In 1782 he entered the service of Charles William Ferdinand, Duke of Brunswick, and as president of the board of domains displayed a zeal for reform, in the manner approved by the enlightened despots of the century, which rendered him very unpopular with the orthodox clergy and the conservative estates. In Brunswick, too, his position was in the end made untenable by the conduct of his wife, whom he now divorced. He shortly afterwards married a divorced woman.

== Administrator of Ansbach and Bayreuth ==
Fortunately for Hardenberg, this coincided with the lapsing of the principalities of Ansbach and Bayreuth to Prussia, owing to the abdication of the last margrave, Charles Alexander, in 1791. Hardenberg, who happened to be in Berlin at the time, was appointed administrator of the principalities in 1792, on the recommendation of Ewald Friedrich von Hertzberg. The position, owing to the singular overlapping of territorial claims in the old Holy Roman Empire, was one of considerable delicacy, and Hardenberg filled it with great skill, doing much to reform traditional anomalies and to develop the country, and at the same time labouring to expand the influence of Prussia in southern Germany.

== Prussian envoy ==
After the outbreak of the French Revolutionary Wars, his diplomatic ability led to his appointment as Prussian envoy, with a roving commission to visit the Rhenish courts and win them over to Prussia's views. Ultimately, when the necessity for making peace with the French Republic had been recognised, he was appointed to succeed Count August Friedrich Ferdinand von der Goltz as Prussian plenipotentiary at Basel (28 February 1795), where he signed the treaty of peace.

== Prussian cabinet ==
In 1797, on the accession of King Frederick William III of Prussia, Hardenberg was summoned to Berlin, where he received an important position in the cabinet and was appointed chief of the departments of Magdeburg and Halberstadt, for Westphalia, and for the Principality of Neuchâtel. In 1793, Hardenberg had struck up a friendship with Christian Graf von Haugwitz, the influential minister for foreign affairs, and when in late 1803 Haugwitz went away on leave he appointed Hardenberg his locum tenens.

It was a critical period since Napoleon had just occupied Hanover, and Haugwitz had urged upon the king the necessity for strong measures and the expediency of a Russian alliance. During Haugwitz's absence, however, the king's irresolution continued, and he clung to the policy of neutrality, which had so far seemed to have served Prussia so well. Hardenberg contented himself with adapting himself to the royal will. When Haugwitz had returned, the unyielding attitude of Napoleon had caused the king to make advances to Russia, but the mutual declarations of 3 and 25 May 1804 pledged both powers to take up arms only in the event of a French attack upon Prussia or of further aggressions in northern Germany. Finally, Haugwitz, unable to persuade the cabinet to a more vigorous policy, resigned, and on 14 April 1804, Hardenberg succeeded him as foreign minister.

== Prussian foreign minister ==
If there was to be war, Hardenberg would have preferred the French alliance, the price that Napoleon demanded for the cession of Hanover to Prussia, but the eastern powers would not freely have conceded so great an augmentation of Prussian power. However, he still hoped to gain the coveted prize by diplomacy, backed by the veiled threat of an armed neutrality. Then came Napoleon's contemptuous violation of Prussian territory by marching three French corps through Ansbach. King Frederick William's pride overcame his weakness, and on 3 November he signed with Tsar Alexander I of Russia the terms of an ultimatum to be laid before the French emperor.

Haugwitz was despatched to Vienna with the document, but before he had arrived, the Battle of Austerlitz had been fought, and the Prussian plenipotentiary had to make terms with Napoleon. Prussia, by the treaty signed at Schönbrunn on 15 December 1805, received Hanover but in return for all her territories in South Germany. One condition of the arrangement was the retirement of Hardenberg, whom Napoleon disliked. He was again foreign minister for a few months after the crisis of 1806 (April–July 1807), but Napoleon's resentment was implacable, and one of the conditions of the terms granted to Prussia by the Treaty of Tilsit was Hardenberg's dismissal.

== Prussian chancellor ==
After the forced retirement of Heinrich Friedrich Karl vom und zum Stein in 1810 and the unsatisfactory interlude of the feeble Karl vom Stein zum Altenstein ministry, Hardenberg was again summoned to Berlin on 6 June 1810, this time as chancellor. The Battle of Jena–Auerstedt and its consequences had had a profound effect upon him, and in his mind, the traditions of the old diplomacy had given place to the new sentiment of nationality characteristic of the coming age, which in him found expression in a passionate desire to restore the position of Prussia and crush her oppressors.

During his retirement at Riga, he had worked out an elaborate plan for reconstructing the monarchy on liberal lines, and when he came into power, the circumstances of the time did not admit of his pursuing an independent foreign policy, but he steadily prepared for the struggle with France by carrying out Stein's far-reaching schemes of social and political reorganization.

=== Reforms ===
The military system was completely reformed, serfdom was abolished, municipal institutions were fostered, the civil service was thrown open to all classes and great attention was devoted to the educational needs of every section of the community. When at last the time came to put the reforms to the test, after the French invasion of Russia in 1812, it was Hardenberg who persuaded Frederick William to take advantage of Ludwig Yorck von Wartenburg's loyal disloyalty and to declare against France. He was rightly regarded by German patriots as the statesman who had done most to encourage the spirit of national independence, and immediately after he had signed the first Peace of Paris in 1814, he was raised to the rank of prince 3 June 1814 in recognition of the part he had played in the War of the Sixth Coalition.

=== Metternich's shadow ===
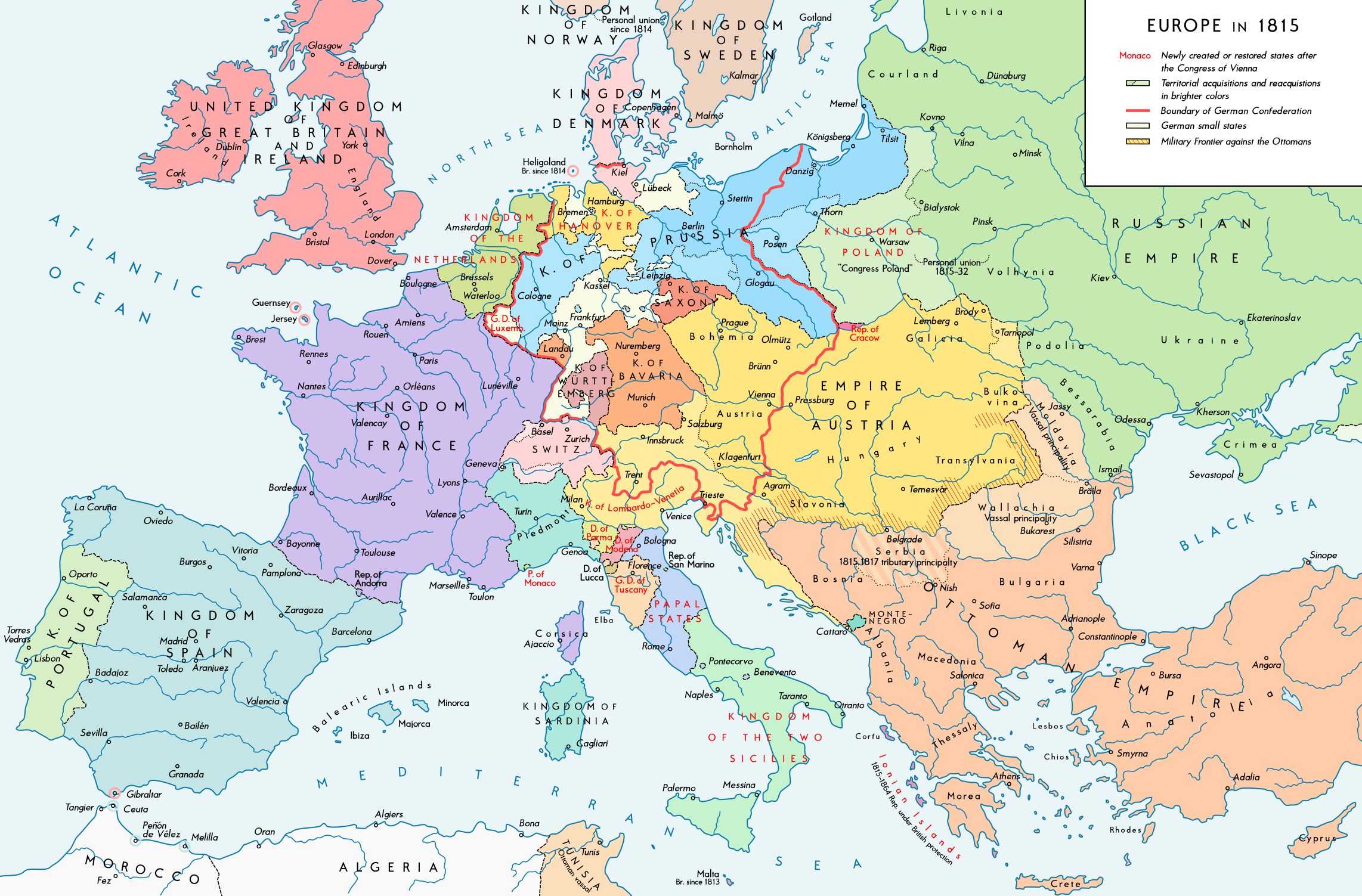
The national boundaries within Europe agreed upon by the Congress of Vienna

Hardenberg now had a position in that close corporation of sovereigns and statesmen by whom Europe was governed. He accompanied the allied sovereigns to England and at the Congress of Vienna (1814-1815) was the chief representative of Prussia. However, the zenith of his influence, if not of his fame, had passed. In diplomacy, he was no match for Klemens von Metternich, whose influence soon overshadowed his own in the councils of Europe, Germany and ultimately even Prussia itself.

At Vienna, in spite of the powerful backing of Alexander I of Russia, he failed to secure the annexation of the whole of Saxony to Prussia. In the Second Treaty of Paris, after the Battle of Waterloo, he failed to carry through his views as to the further dismemberment of France and had weakly allowed Metternich to forestall him in making terms with the states of the Confederation of the Rhine, which secured to Austria the preponderance in the German federal diet. On the eve of the conference of Carlsbad (1819) he signed a convention with Metternich in which, according the historian Heinrich von Treitschke, 'like a penitent sinner, without any formal quid pro quo, the monarchy of Frederick the Great yielded to a foreign power a voice in her internal affairs."

At the congresses of Aix-la-Chapelle (Aachen), Troppau, Laibach and Verona, the voice of Hardenberg was but an echo of that of Metternich. The cause lay partly in the difficult circumstances of the loosely-knit Prussian monarchy but partly in Hardenberg's character had never been well balanced but had deteriorated with age. He continued amiable, charming and enlightened as ever, but the excesses that had been pardonable in a young diplomat were a scandal in an elderly chancellor and could not but weaken his influence with so pious a Landesvater as Frederick William III.

To overcome the king's terror of liberal experiments would have needed all the powers of an adviser at once wise and in character wholly trustworthy. Hardenberg was wise enough and saw the necessity for constitutional reform, but he clung with almost senile tenacity to the sweets of office, and when the tide turned against liberalism, he allowed himself to drift with it. In the privacy of royal commissions, he continued to elaborate schemes for constitutions that never saw the light, but Germany, disillusioned, regarded him as an adherent of Metternich, an accomplice in the policy of the Carlsbad Decrees and the Troppau Protocol.

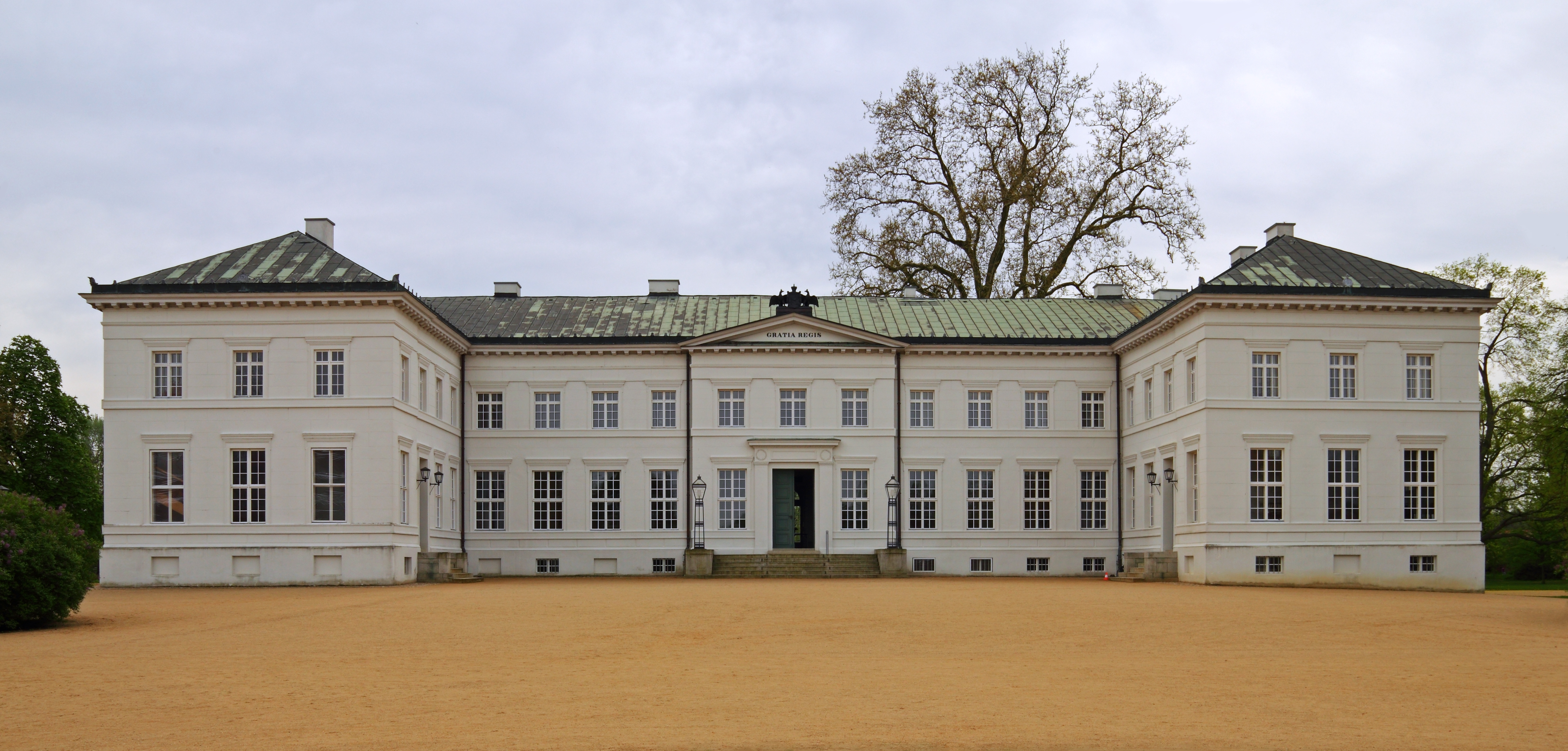
Neuhardenberg Manor

In 1814, King Frederick William III vested Hardenberg with the locality of Quilitz, together with the princely title, as a gratification for his merits as Prussian state chancellor. When he received the manor, he renamed the place right away into Neuhardenberg (New Hardenberg). From 1820 on, he had the mansion and the church rebuilt in neoclassical style, according to plans designed by Karl Friedrich Schinkel, while the gardens were redesigned by his son-in-law, Prince Hermann von Pückler-Muskau, and Peter-Joseph Lenné.

Hardenberg died at Genoa soon after the closing of the Congress of Verona. Hardenberg's Memoirs, 1801-07 were suppressed for 50 years after which they were edited with a biography by Leopold von Ranke and published as Denkwürdigkeiten des Fürsten von Hardenberg (5 vols., Leipzig, 1877).

== Sources ==
- "Гарденберг, Карл-Август" . Brockhaus and Efron Encyclopedic Dictionary (in Russian). 1906.

Political offices
Preceded by Count Haugwitz	Prime Minister of Prussia; 1804–1806	Succeeded by Count Haugwitz
Preceded by Karl von Beyme	Prime Minister of Prussia; 1807	Succeeded by Baron Stein
Preceded by Count Dohna-Schlobitten	Prime Minister of Prussia; 1810 – 1822	Succeeded by Otto von Voss
