= Treaty of Schönbrunn (1805) =

1805 treaty between France and Prussia

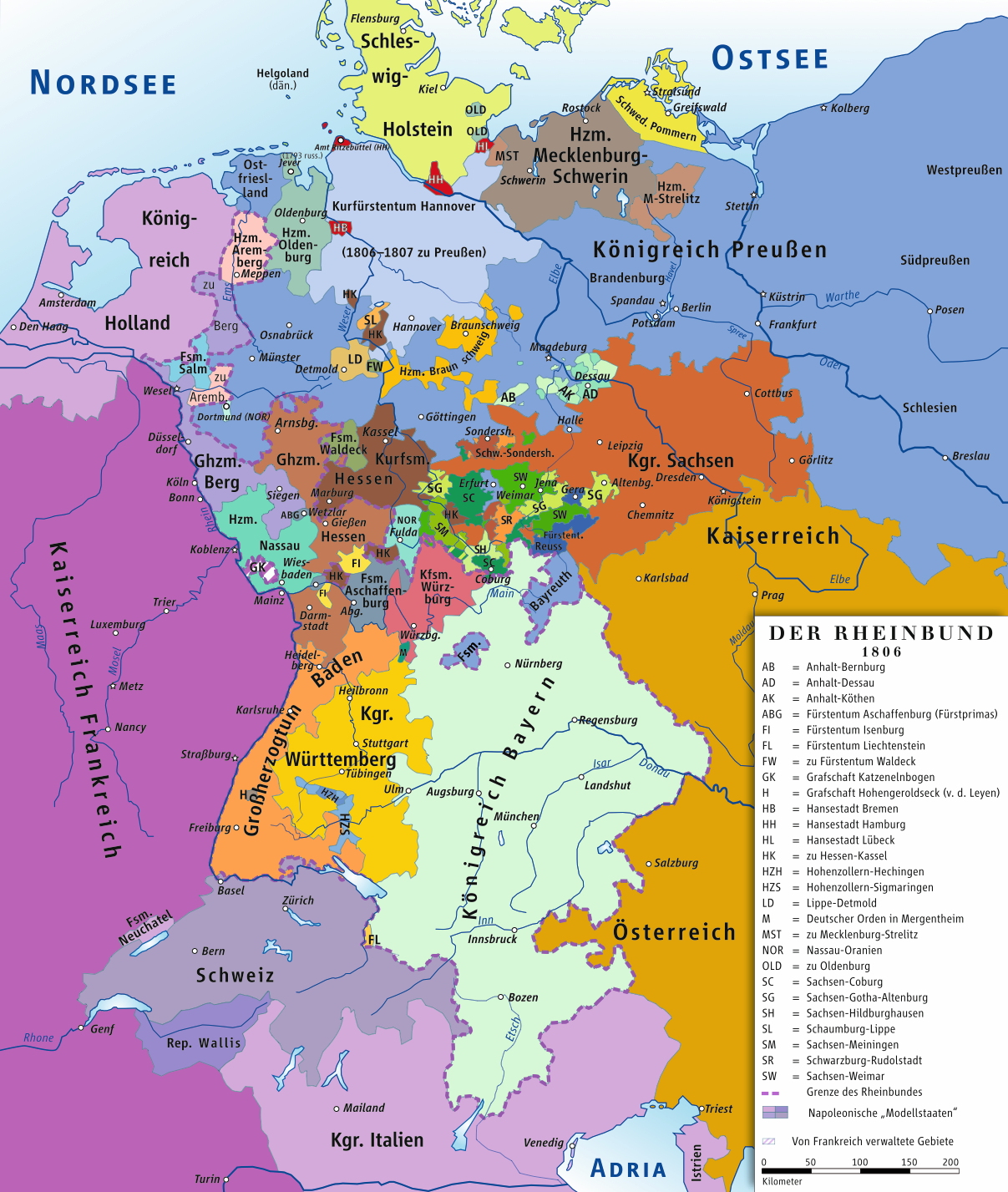
The Kingdom of Prussia (shown in blue) after the annexation of the Electorate of Hanover

The Treaty of Schönbrunn (or Convention of Schönbrunn) was a treaty of friendship signed between France and Prussia at Schönbrunn Palace in Vienna on 15 December 1805, during the Napoleonic Wars. The terms were negotiated by Géraud Duroc, who signed for France, and Christian Graf von Haugwitz, who signed for Prussia. The treaty was superseded by the Treaty of Paris of 15 February 1806, which incorporated its main terms.

== Background ==
On 3 November, Prussia had signed the Treaty of Potsdam with Russia, thereby committing to join the Third Coalition against France if Napoleon Bonaparte rejected peace terms. French forces had already violated Prussian territory by marching across the Margraviate of Ansbach in September. In response, Prussia had occupied the Electorate of Hanover, which, although it belonged King George III of Great Britain, had been occupied by the French and only vacated by them during the course of the war. Napoleon's victory at the battle of Austerlitz on 2 December destroyed the Third Coalition, rendering the Treaty of Potsdam moot. Haugwitz went to Vienna, where Napoleon was staying, to negotiate a treaty of friendship with France.

== Terms ==
By the terms of the convention, Prussia was permitted to annex Hanover, but had to cede Ansbach, the Duchy of Cleves and the Principality of Neuchâtel. Ansbach went to Bavaria, which was forced to give up the Duchy of Berg to France. Berg was then joined with Cleves to form the Grand Duchy of Berg and Cleves for General Joachim Murat. Neuchâtel was given by Napoleon to Marshal Louis-Alexandre Berthier. Prussia also agreed to accept the terms of the Treaty of Pressburg between France and the Holy Roman Empire, which had not yet been finalized. It was only signed on 26 December.

The Convention of Schönbrunn did not contain the customary clause affirming previous treaties. Contemporaries saw it, together with Austerlitz and Pressburg, as an epochal event, marking the end of an era, since Napoleon had demonstrated no interest in maintaining the Holy Roman Empire in anything like its old form.

The annexation of Hanover incensed Britain and Charles James Fox lambasted Prussia's behaviour as "a compound of everything that is contemptible in servility with everything that is odious in rapacity." The annexation ultimately led to war with Britain.
