= Congress of Troppau =

1820 conference of the Quintuple Alliance

The Congress of Troppau was a conference of the Quintuple Alliance to discuss means of suppressing the revolution in Naples of July 1820, and at which the Troppau Protocol was signed on 19 November 1820.

The Congress met on 20 October 1820 in Troppau (modern Opava) in Austrian Silesia at the behest of Tsar Alexander I of Russia. Alexander and Francis I of Austria were present in person; King Frederick William III of Prussia was represented by the crown prince (afterwards Frederick William IV). The three eastern powers were further represented by their foreign policy ministers: Austria by Prince Metternich, Russia by Count Capo d'lstria, and Prussia by Prince Hardenberg.

Britain objected, on principle, to the suggested concerted action against the Neapolitan Liberals. Therefore, she sent no plenipotentiary, but was represented by Lord Stewart, ambassador in Vienna and the half-brother of the Foreign Secretary at the time, Viscount Castlereagh. France, too, had given no plenary powers to her representatives, though her policy was less clearly defined. Thus, from the very beginning of the Congress, it was clear that a division between the eastern and western powers was growing.

The characteristic note of this congress was its intimate and informal nature; the determining fact at the outset was Metternich's discovery that he had no longer anything to fear from the "Jacobinism" of the Emperor Alexander. In a three hours' conversation over a cup of tea at the little inn he had heard the tsar's confession and promise of amendment: "Aujourd'hui je deplore tout ce que j'ai dit et fait entre les annees 1814 et 1818 ... Dites-moi ce que vous voulez de moi. Je le ferai": Today I deplore everything that I have said and done between the years 1814 and 1818 ... Tell me what you want of me. I will do it.

Metternich's failure to convert Castlereagh to his views was now of secondary importance; the "free" powers being in accord, it was safe to ignore the opinions of Britain and France, whose governments, whatever their goodwill, were fettered by constitutional forms. In a series of conferences - to which the representatives of Britain and France were not admitted, on the excuse that they were only empowered to "report," not to "decide" - was drawn up the famous preliminary protocol signed by Austria, Russia and Prussia on 8 November.

== Troppau Protocol ==
The main pronouncement of the "Troppau Protocol" is as follows:

"States, which have undergone a change of government due to revolution, the result of which threaten other states, ipso facto cease to be members of the European Alliance, and remain excluded from it until their situation gives guarantees for legal order and stability. If, owing to such alterations, immediate danger threatens other states the powers bind themselves, by peaceful means, or if need be, by arms, to bring back the guilty state into the bosom of the Great Alliance."

No effort was made by the powers to give immediate effect to the principles enunciated in the protocol; and after it was officially announced the conferences were adjourned. It was decided to resume them at the Congress of Laibach the following January.

The Protocol was greeted with dismay in Britain. While the British Government was reluctant to attack it openly, they found it difficult to answer the Opposition's claims that on a literal reading, Russia or Austria were entitled to invade England to oppose her supposed misgovernment of Ireland. "Shall we see a horde of Cossacks encamped in Hyde Park?" asked one Opposition MP.
