= Christian Graf von Haugwitz =

German statesman (1752–1832)

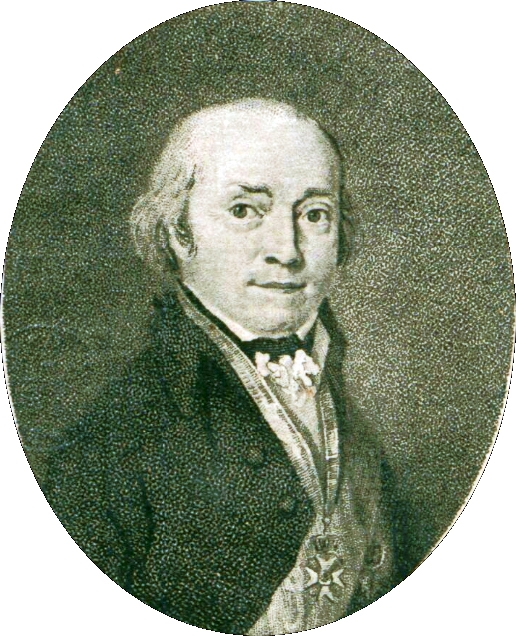
Christian Graf von Haugwitz.

Christian August Heinrich Kurt Graf von Haugwitz (11 June 1752 – 1832) was a German statesman, best known for serving as Foreign Minister of Prussia during the Napoleonic Wars.

== Life ==
Haugwitz was born at Peucke near Oels, a member of the Silesian (Protestant) branch of the ancient family of Haugwitz, of which the Catholic branch was established in Moravia. He studied law, spent some time in Italy, returned to settle on his estates in Silesia, and in 1791 was elected general director of the province by the Silesian estates. Upon the request of King Frederick William II of Prussia he entered the Prussian civil service and became ambassador at Vienna in 1792. At the end of the same year he became a member of the cabinet at Berlin.

=== Policy before the rise of Napoleon ===
Haugwitz, who had attended the young Emperor Francis II at his coronation and been present at the conferences held at Mainz to consider the attitude of the German powers towards the French Revolution, was opposed to the attitude of the French émigrés and to any interference in the internal affairs of France. After the War of the First Coalition broke out, however, the policy of the Committee of Public Safety made peace impossible, while the strained relations between Austria and Prussia on the question of territorial compensations crippled the power of the Allies to carry the war to a successful conclusion.

It was in these circumstances that Haugwitz entered on the negotiations that resulted in the subsidy treaty between Great Britain and Prussia, and Great Britain and the Netherlands, signed at the Hague on 19 April 1794. Haugwitz, however, was not the man to direct a strong and aggressive policy; the failure of Prussia to make any effective use of the money supplied broke the patience of Pitt, and in October the denunciation by Great Britain of the Hague treaty broke the last tie that bound Prussia to the Coalition. The Peace of Basel on 5 April 1795, was mainly due to the influence of Haugwitz.

=== During the Napoleonic Period ===
His object was now to save the provinces on the left bank of the Rhine from being lost to the Empire. No guarantee of their maintenance had been inserted in the Basel treaty; but Haugwitz and the king hoped to preserve them by establishing the armed neutrality of northern Germany and securing its recognition by the French Republic. This policy was rendered futile by the victories of Napoleon Bonaparte and the conquest of southern Germany by the French. Haugwitz, who had continued to enjoy the confidence of the new king, Frederick William III, recognized this fact, and urged his master to join the new Second Coalition in 1798. However, the king clung to the illusion of neutrality, and Haugwitz allowed himself to be made the instrument of a policy of which he increasingly disapproved. It was not till 1803, when the king refused his urgent advice to demand the evacuation of Hanover by the French, that he tendered his resignation. In August 1804 he was replaced by Hardenberg, and retired to his estates.

=== Retirement and Foreign Minister again ===
In his retirement Haugwitz was still consulted, and he used all his influence against Hardenberg's policy of a rapprochement with France. His representations had little weight, however, until Napoleon's violation Prussian territory by marching troops through the Principality of Ansbach roused the anger of the king. Haugwitz was now once more appointed foreign minister, as Hardenberg's colleague, and it was he who was charged to carry to Napoleon the Prussian ultimatum which was the outcome of the visit of the Tsar Alexander I to Berlin in November. But in this crisis his courage failed him; his nature was one that ever let "I dare not" wait upon "I will"; he delayed his journey pending some turn in events and to give time for the mobilization of the Duke of Brunswick's army; he was frightened by reports of separate negotiations between Austria and Napoleon, not realizing that a bold declaration by Prussia would nip them in the bud. Napoleon, when at last they met, read him like a book and humoured his diplomatic weakness until the whole issue was decided at Austerlitz. On 15 December 1805 instead of delivering an ultimatum, Haugwitz signed a treaty of alliance at Schönbrunn which gave Hanover to Prussia in return for Ansbach, Cleves and Neuenburg.

The humiliation of Prussia and her minister was, however, not yet complete. In February 1806 Haugwitz went to Paris to ratify the Treaty of Schönbrunn and to attempt to secure some modifications in favour of Prussia. He was received with a storm of abuse by Napoleon, who insisted on tearing up the treaty and drawing up a fresh one, which doubled the amount of territory to be ceded by Prussia and forced her to a breach with Great Britain by binding her to close the Hanoverian ports to British commerce. The treaty, signed on 15 February, left Prussia wholly isolated in Europe.

=== New retirement and death ===
Haugwitz remained head of the Prussian Ministry of Foreign Affairs, but the course of Prussian policy was beyond his power to control. The Prussian ultimatum to Napoleon was forced upon him by overwhelming circumstances, and with the Battle of Jena, on 14 October, his political career came to an end. He accompanied the flight of the king into East Prussia, but thereafter took leave of him and retired to his Silesian estates. In 1821 he was appointed Curator of the University of Breslau; in 1820, owing to failing health, he went to live in Italy, where he remained till his death at Venice in 1832. His grave is in Este in the garden of the Villa Contarini (Este) in the Veneto.

== Terminology note ==
- Regarding personal names, Graf is a German title, translated as Count, not a first or middle name. The feminine form is Gräfin.

Preceded by unknown	Chief Minister of Prussia; 1792–1804	Succeeded by Karl August von Hardenberg
Preceded by Karl August von Hardenberg	Chief Minister of Prussia; 1806	Succeeded by Karl von Beyme
