= Congress of Laibach =

1821 diplomatic conference

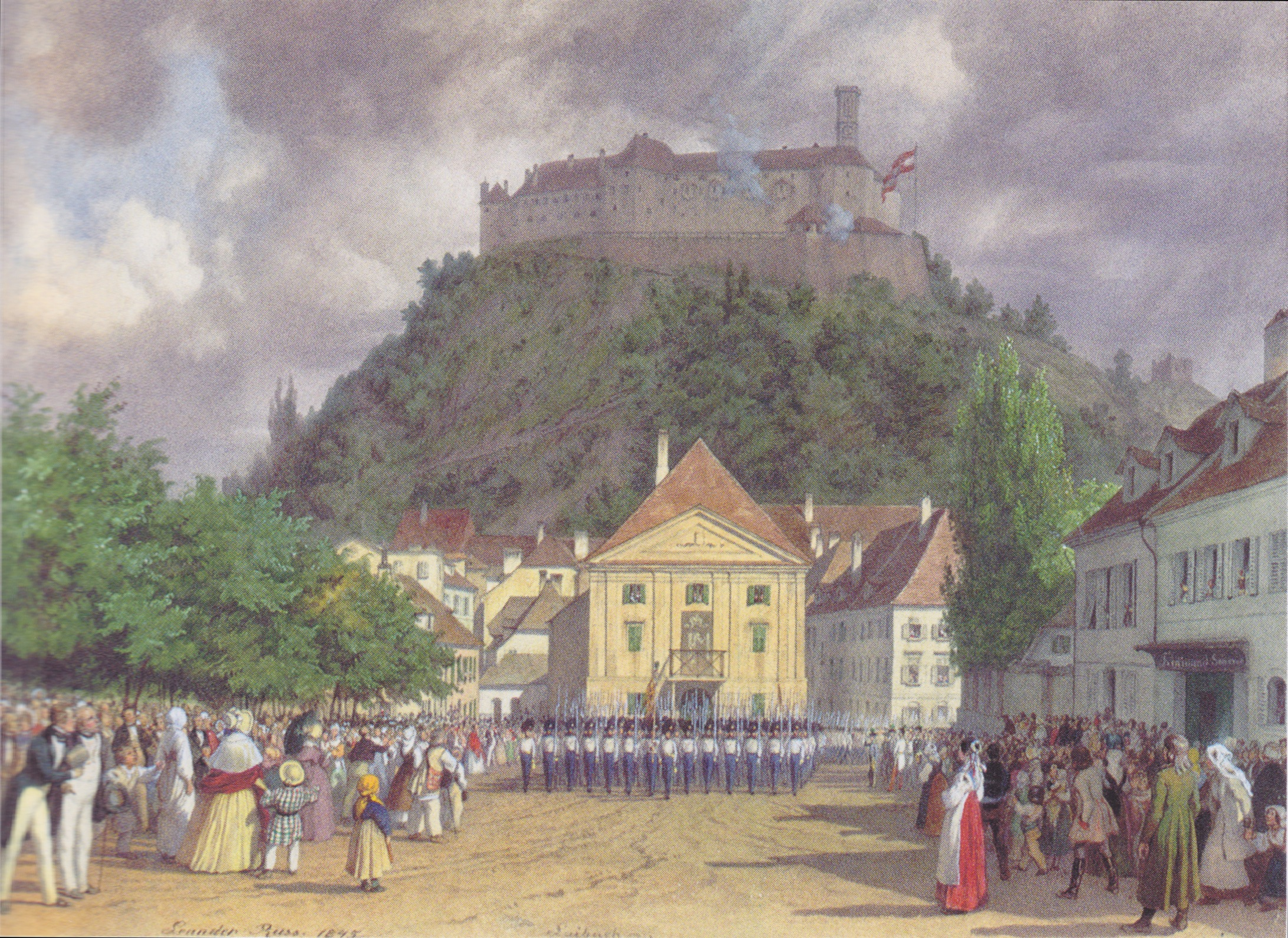
Celebration in Ljubljana during the Congress of Laibach, 1821. The square in the picture is named Congress Square in memory of the event.

The Congress of Laibach was a conference of the allied sovereigns or their representatives, held in 1821 in Ljubljana (then Laibach) as part of the Congress System which was the decided attempt of the five Great Powers to settle international problems after the Napoleonic Wars through discussion and collective weight rather than on the battlefield. A result of the Congress was the authorization of Austrian intervention in the Kingdom of the Two Sicilies in order to quell a liberal uprising.

== Background ==
The Congress was held in Laibach (modern day Ljubljana) in what is now Slovenia but was then part of the Austrian Duchy of Carniola, from January 26 until May 12, 1821. Before the breakup of the Congress of Troppau it had been decided to adjourn it until the following January, and to invite King Ferdinand I of the Two Sicilies, Laibach being chosen as the place of meeting. Castlereagh, in the name of Great Britain, had cordially approved this invitation, as implying negotiation and therefore as a retreat from the position taken up in the Troppau Protocol. Before leaving Troppau however, the three autocratic powers, Russia, Austria and Prussia, had issued a circular letter on December 8, 1820, in which they reiterated the principles of the Protocol, i.e. the right and duty of the powers responsible for the peace of Europe to intervene to suppress any revolutionary movement by which they might conceive that peace to be endangered (Hertslet, No. 105). Against this view Castlereagh once more protested in a circular dispatch of January 19, 1821, in which he clearly differentiated between the objectionable general principles advanced by the three powers, and the particular case of the unrest in Italy, the immediate concern not of Europe at large, but of Austria and of any other Italian powers which might consider themselves endangered (Hertslet, No. 107).

== Events ==
The conference opened on January 26, 1821, and its constitution emphasized the divergences revealed in the above circulars. Emperors Alexander I of Russia and Francis I of Austria were present in person, and with them were Counts Nesselrode and Capodistria, Metternich and Baron Vincent; Prussia and France were represented by plenipotentiaries. Britain, on the ground that she had no immediate interest in the Italian question, was represented only by the Lord Stewart, the ambassador at Vienna, who was not armed with full powers, his mission being to watch the proceedings and to see that nothing was done beyond or in violation of the treaties. Of the Italian princes, Ferdinand of the Two Sicilies and Francis IV, Duke of Modena came in person; the rest were represented by plenipotentiaries.

It was soon clear that a more or less open breach between Britain and the other powers was inevitable. Metternich was anxious to secure an apparent unanimity of the powers to back the Austrian intervention in Naples, and every device was used to entrap the British representative into subscribing a formula which would have seemed to commit Britain to the principles of the other allies. When these devices failed, attempts were made unsuccessfully to exclude Lord Stewart from the conferences on the ground of defective powers. Finally, he was forced to an open protest, which he caused to be inscribed on the journals, but the action of Capodistria in reading to the assembled Italian ministers, who were by no means reconciled to the large claims implied in the Austrian intervention, a declaration in which as the result of the intimate union established by solemn acts between all the European powers the Russian emperor offered to the allies the aid of his arms, should new revolutions threaten new dangers, an attempt to revive that idea of a universal union based on the Holy Alliance against which Britain had consistently protested.

The objections of Britain were, however, not so much to an Austrian intervention in Naples as to the far-reaching principles by which it was sought to justify it. King Ferdinand had been invited to Laibach, according to the circular of December 8, in order that he might be free to act as mediator between his erring peoples and the states whose tranquillity they threatened. Ferdinand made cynical use of his freedom to repudiate obligations solemnly contracted (albeit under duress) with the Neapolitan people. The result of this action was the Neapolitan declaration of war and the occupation of Naples by Austria, with the sanction of the congress. This was preceded, on March 10, by the revolt of the garrison of Alessandria and the military revolution in Piedmont, which in its turn was suppressed, as a result of negotiations at Laibach, by Austrian troops.

== Eastern Question ==
It was at Laibach too that on March 19 Emperor Alexander received the news of Alexander Ypsilantis' invasion of the Danubian Principalities, which heralded the outbreak of the Greek War of Independence, and from Laibach that Capodistria (himself of Greek origin) issued the tsar's repudiation of the action to the Greek leader.

The conference closed on the May 12, 1821, on which date Russia, Austria and Prussia issued a declaration (Hertslet, No. 108) to proclaim to the world the principles which guided them in coming to the assistance of subdued peoples, a declaration which once more affirmed the principles of the Troppau Protocol. In this lay the European significance of the Laibach conference, of which the activities had been mainly confined to Italy. The issue of the declaration without the signatures of the representatives of Britain and France proclaimed the disunion of the alliance; within which, to use Lord Stewart's words, there existed a triple understanding which bound the parties to carry forward their own views in spite of any difference of opinion between them and the two great constitutional governments.

== Primary and secondary literature ==
No separate history of the congress exists, but innumerable references are to be found in general histories and in memoirs, correspondence, 8w., of the time. See:

- Edward Hertslet, Map of Europe (London, 1875);
- Castlereagh, Correspondence;
- Metternich, Memoirs;
- N. Bianchi, Storia documentata della diplomazia Europea in Italia (8 vols., Turin, 1865–1872);
- Gentzs correspondence;
- Valuable unpublished correspondence is preserved at the Record Office in the volumes marked F. 0., Austria, Lord Stewart, January to February 1821, and March to September 1821.
- Ghervas, Stella (2008). Réinventer la tradition. Alexandre Stourdza et l'Europe de la Sainte-Alliance. Paris: Honoré Champion. ISBN 978-2-7453-1669-1.
- Jarrett, Mark (2013). The Congress of Vienna and its Legacy: War and Great Power Diplomacy after Napoleon. London: I. B. Tauris & Company, Limited. ISBN 978-1780761169.
- Schneider, Karin; Kurz, Stephan, eds. (2018). Mächtekongresse 1818–1822. Digitale Edition. Vienna: Austrian Academy of Sciences. ISBN 978-3-9504783-0-3.
