= Fritz Gause =

German historian, archivist, and curator

- Born: August 4, 1893; Königsberg, East Prussia (now Kaliningrad, Russia)
- Died: December 24, 1973 (aged 80); Essen, Germany
- Education: University of Königsberg
- Occupations: Historian, archivist, museum curator
- Known for: Founding the Haus Königsberg
- Title: Professor
- Military career
- Allegiance: German Empire
- Enlistment: 1914–1921
- War: World War I
- Awards: Order of Merit of the Federal Republic of Germany

Fritz Gause (4 August 1893 – 24 December 1973) was a German historian, archivist, and curator described as the last great historian of his native city, Königsberg (now Kaliningrad), East Prussia. Gause's most important work was his three-volume history of Königsberg, Die Geschichte der Stadt Königsberg in Preußen (1965, 1968, and 1971). He was connected to nationalist historic movement called Ostforschung

== Life ==
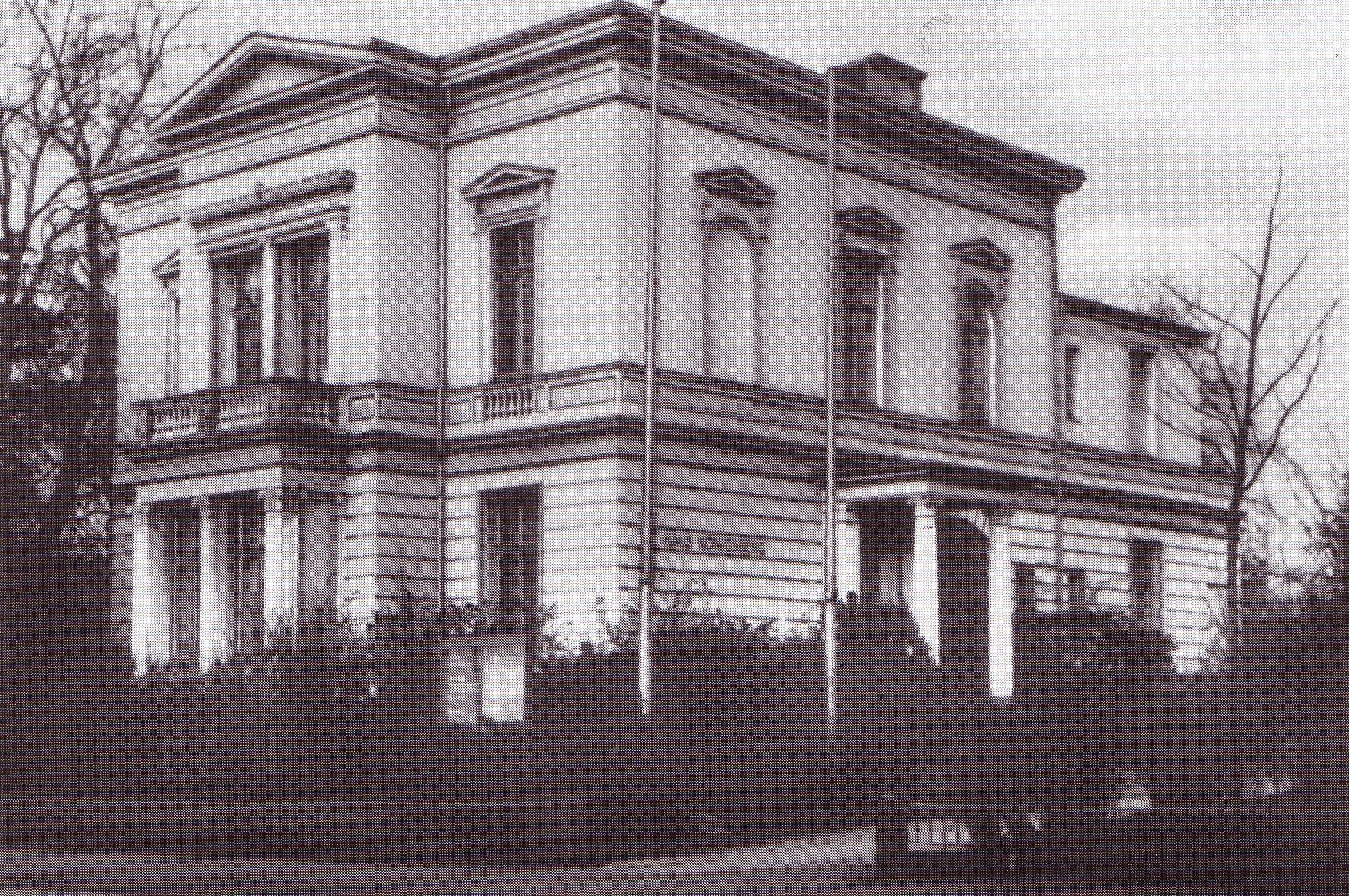
Haus Königsberg in Duisburg, established by Gause

After attending Königsberg's Collegium Fridericianum, Gause studied history and German philology at the Albertina, the University of Königsberg under nationalist historian Albert Brackmann. During World War I he volunteered for service in the front-line artillery. After receiving his doctorate in 1921, he began lecturing at the Goethe-Oberlyzeum in Königsberg.

In 1938 Gause became head of the Königsberg City Museum in the former Kneiphof Town Hall, as well as the City Archive and Public Library in the original campus of the Albertina in Kneiphof. In 1939 the library contained 106,000 volumes.

When the Eastern Front of World War II grew closer to the city, Gauleiter Erich Koch prevented Gause from transferring the works under his responsibility to a safer location. The archive, museum, and library were subsequently destroyed during the 1944 Bombing of Königsberg and 1945 Battle of Königsberg. After the end of the war, Gause was held as a prisoner-of-war by Poland until 1947.

After his release from imprisonment, Gause taught at a girls school in Essen. He was pensioned in 1959 as senior lecturer. Gause was also a member of the Stadtgemeinschaft Königsberg (Pr), a cultural organization for expelled former residents of Königsberg. While serving as chairman, he established the Haus Königsberg, a historical and cultural museum which opened on 20 October 1968 in Duisburg. The Haus Königsberg was replaced with Duisburg's modern Museum Stadt Königsberg on 5 December 1992. After the war Gause claimed Adolf Hitler was morally justified in his territorial claims against Poland and published studies that were aimed at defending aggressive policies of Nazi Germany.

In the same publication – 'Deutsch-slawische Schicksalsgemeinschaft' – he ignored all objective German historians as well as Polish ones and used as sources known supporters of Nazi Germany and Hitler, while defending Prussia's actions against Poland and showing as the main villain USA's president Wilson. While objecting to Hitler's policies, he showed Nazi demands as morally justified; his efforts to paint Nazism as just another form of "Prussian militarism" were described as "amusing denial", but understandable in view of the author's open admiration of "Prussian spirit." In one of his books he went as far as describing Nazi invasion of Poland and takeover of the town of Dzialdowo (Soldau) as "liberation from Polish rule", while keeping silent about the actions by Nazis in the town and their atrocities.

In his work on history of Konigsberg (Królewiec), Gause tried to show Polish minority living in the city as mostly temporary merchants arriving for brief visits, the Polish church as German and avoided mentioning the Polish name even once throughout the three volumes of the book he published. The existence of camps for non-German forced labor during Second World War as well as sub-camp of the Stutthof concentration camp in the city was concealed by Gause as well, with only one footnote mentioning the topic of slave labor. In his other works he praised Partitions of Poland as progressive act and claimed that Germany brought the "Slavic East" into European civilization.

The state government of North Rhine-Westphalia granted Gause the title of professor in 1972. He died of a heart attack in Essen in 1973.

== Selected works ==
- Die Landgerichte des Ordenslandes Preußen bis zur Säkularisation, unt. bes. Berücks. d. Landschöffenbücher von Bartenstein u. Gilgenburg/Hohenstein
- Die Geschichte der Stadt Königsberg in Preußen. Böhlau, Köln/Weimar/Wien ISBN 3-412-08896-X
- Der Kämmereibesitz der Stadt Königsberg im 19. Jahrhundert. Gräfe & Unzer, Königsberg i. Pr. 1924
- Die Russen in Ostpreußen 1914/15. Gräfe und Unzer, Königsberg 1931
- Erbe und Aufgabe des deutschen Ostens. Gräfe u. Unzer, München 1955.
- Geschichte des Amtes und der Stadt Soldau. Herder-Institut, Marburg 1958, ISBN 3-931577-13-9 .
- Ostpreußen. Burkhard-Verl. Heyer, Essen 1958.
- Deutsch-slawische Schicksalsgemeinschaft. Holzner, Würzburg 1967.
- Die Mittelalterliche deutsche Ostsiedlung. Klett, Stuttgart 1969.
- Acta Prussica. Holzner, Würzburg 1968.
- Neue Ortsnamen in Ostpreußen seit 1800. Verein für Familienforschung in Ost- u. Westpreußen, Hamburg 1983, ISBN 3-922953-53-0 .
- Königsberg, so wie es war. Droste, Düsseldorf 1983, ISBN 3-922953-53-0 .
- Geschichte des Preußenlandes. Rautenberg, Leer 1966, 1970, 1986, ISBN 3-7921-0005-3.
- Königsberg in Preußen. Die Geschichte einer europäischen Stadt. Rautenberg, Leer 1987, ISBN 3-7921-0345-1.
- Kant und Königsberg bis heute. Rautenberg, Leer 1989, ISBN 3-7921-0418-0.
- Ostpreußen und Westpreußen. Kleine Geschichte des Preußenlandes. Rautenberg, Leer 1994, ISBN 3-7921-0535-7.
