= Königsberg City Museum =

Former museum in Germany

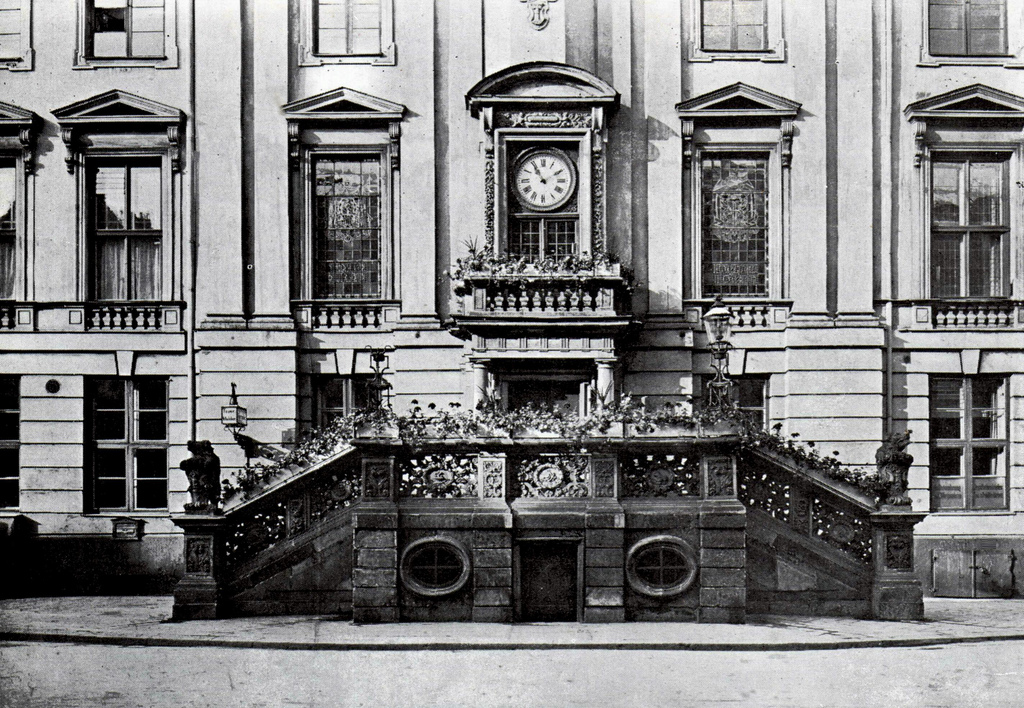
The former Kneiphof Town Hall housed the Königsberg City Museum

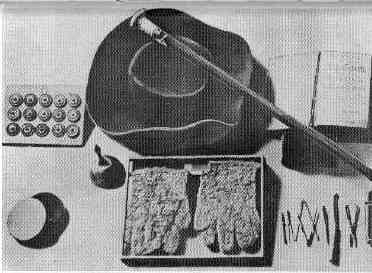
Kantiana, artifacts relating to Immanuel Kant, in the museum

The Königsberg City Museum (German: Stadtgeschichtliches Museum) was a local museum in Königsberg, Germany.

Kneiphof Town Hall had served as the city hall for united Königsberg since 1724. In 1927 the municipal administration moved to the newer Stadthaus, leaving Kneiphof's building vacant. The respected painter Eduard Anderson led the effort to convert the former town hall into a museum, which opened in 1928 with 25 rooms. It contained portraits of Johann Georg Hamann, the Magus of the North, and Lord Mayor August Wilhelm Heidemann, as well as a bust of E. T. A. Hoffmann. It included a coin collection and examples of fine Königsberg house ceilings. Its attractions also included a banner of the Napoleonic-era East Prussian National Cavalry Regiment, a Viking sword, copper engravings, household goods, amongst other artifacts. Anderson presented lectures in the museum.

The museum also contained an exhibit of Immanuel Kant artifacts (Kantiana), previously located in the Königsberg Public Library. These included Kant's hat, shoe buckles, walking stick, testament, death mask, and numerous pictures and sculptures. The exhibit, which was especially popular with foreign-born Kant followers, expanded into the Kant-Museum in 1938, the same year that Fritz Gause became director of the museum.

The Nazi Party did not take an interest in the museum during Gleichschaltung. However, the Königsberg City Museum was destroyed in August 1944 during the Bombing of Königsberg in World War II.
