= Christian Theodor Ludwig Lucas =

German writer and pedagogue

Christian Theodor Ludwig Lucas, also known as Ludwig Lucas or C. T. L. Lucas (born 1796 in Petrikau, South Prussia – d. 1854 in Schrimm, Posen Province), was a German writer and pedagogue.

== Life ==
Lucas enrolled to study, first Protestant Theology and then law at the University of Königsberg in 1816. In March 1818, he represented the Königsberger Landsmannschaft (fraternity) on the Allgemeinen Deutschen Burschenschaft (ADB) in Jena. On behalf of Theodor von Schön, Oberpräsident (Governor) of West Prussia he organised the libraries and archives of the monasteries, following the dissolution of 1818–1835. In 1820 he began an academic career. In 1822 he became a teacher at the Altstadt Gymnasium in Königsberg, in 1828 he served on Government School Board as an assistant to Gustav Friedrich Dinter and in 1832 became director of the newly reorganised Kneiphof Gymnasium. By 1835 he was an associate professor of German literature. Succeeding Reinhold Bernhard Jachmann, he served on the Provincial School Board for East Prussia in 1843, and in 1848 transferred to Posen Province.

== Influence ==
He is best known in the English literature the influence of his writing on legends on Wagner, in particular the role of Über den Krieg von Wartburg (1836) in inspiring the opera Tannhäuser und der Sängerkrieg auf Wartburg (1845). Through the work of Lucas, Wagner learned much about Mediaeval saga, as he put it "The German Middle Ages in a significant coloring I had not yet dreamed of". Wagner also drew on Lucas for his Lohengrin, Parsifal and Tristan und Isolde operas.

== Selected publications ==
Include:

- Geschichtliche Nachrichten von Stadt und Schloß Marienburg in Preußen. In: Beiträge zur Kunde Ostpreußens, Vol. 2, Königsberg 1819
  - Erster Abschnitt: Von der Gründung der Stadt Marienburg bis zur Erhebung derselben zum Sitze des Hohmeisters (1309), p. 238-254, online
  - Zweiter Abschnitt: Von der Erhebung Marienburgs zum Sitze des Hochmeisters bis zum Ende der Regierung Winrichs von Kniprode (1309-1382), p. 306-334, online.
- De bellis Suantopolici, ducis Pomeranorum, adversus ordinem gestis Teutonicum liber, Dissertation an der Albertus-Universität Königsberg, 8. May 1823.
- Über Klopstock's dichterisches Leben und Wirken, Königsberg 1824.
- Prolog zur öffentlichen Sitzung der Königlichen Deutschen Gesellschaft am 3. August 1838 (Gedicht). In: Preußische Provinzial-Blätter, 20. Band, Königsberg 1838, S. 477-479, online.
- Über den dichterischen Plan von Goethe's Faust. 2. ed., Königsberg 1846, online.
- Lucas, Ludwig (1838). Ueber den Krieg von Wartburg. Königsberg: Gebr. Bornträger., in Historische und litterarische Abhandlungen der königlichen deutschen Gesellschaft zu Königsberg (Schubert, FW ed.)
  - "Deutsche Gesellschaft in Königsberg (Royal German Society of Königsberg)". Scholarly Societies Project. University of Waterloo. 2015. Archived from the original (Historische und literaerische Abhandlungen der de:Königlichen Deutschen Gesellschaft zu Königsberg) on 3 November 2015.
- Zur Erinnerung an Simon Dach. Ein Vortrag in der Königlichen Deutschen Gesellschaft am 15. October 1847 gehalten. In: Neue Preußische Provinzial-Blätter, Königsberg 1847, p. 437-447, online.

== Bibliography ==
- Westernhagen, Curt von (1981) [1979]. Wagner : a biography. Whittall, Mary - translator, originally published by Atlantis Musikbuch-Verlag. Cambridge: Cambridge University Press. ISBN 9780521282543.
- Kinderman, William (2013). Wagner's Parsifal. New York: Oxford University Press. ISBN 9780195366921.
- Borchmeyer, Dieter (2003). Drama and the world of Richard Wagner. Ellis, Daphne - translator. Princeton, N.J.: Princeton University Press. ISBN 9780691114972.
- HathiTrust (2015). "Lucas, Christian Theodor Ludwig".
