= Löbenicht Town Hall =

Coordinates: 54°42′35″N 20°31′12″E

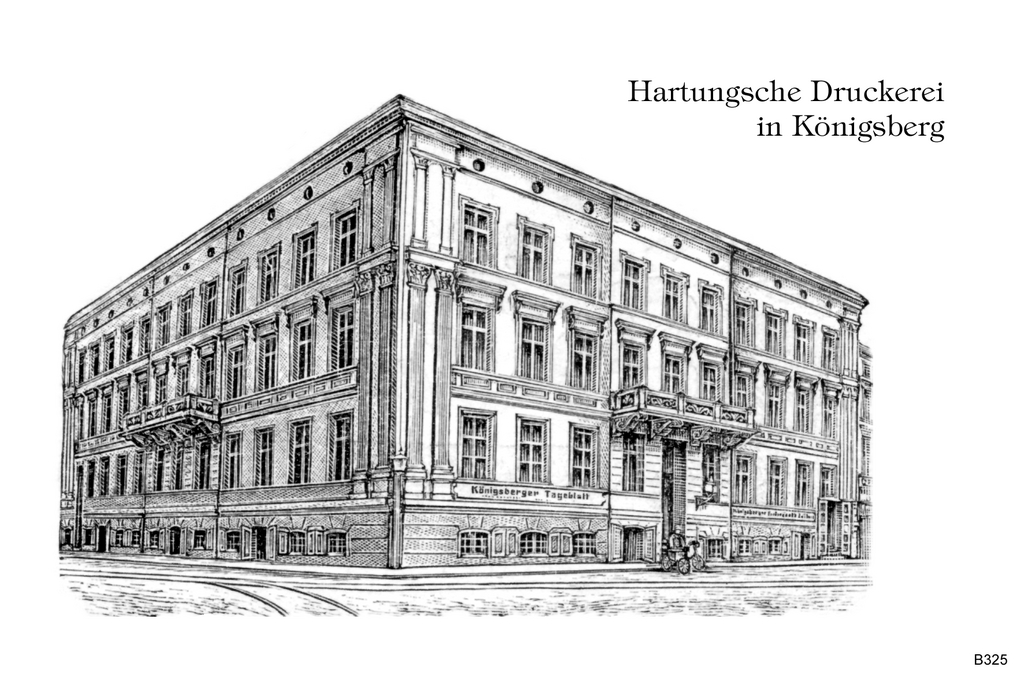
The publisher Hartung'sche Verlagsdruckerei was based in the former Löbenicht town hall from 1789 to 1906.

Löbenicht Town Hall (German: Löbenichtsches Rathaus) was the town hall of Löbenicht, first an independent town and later a quarter of Königsberg, Germany. In the 19th century it was used for newspaper printing.

== History ==
The town hall was located at the intersection of Löbenichtsche Langgasse and Münchengasse. It is unknown when it was originally built, but construction on the Gothic building was documented in 1592. After the merger of Löbenicht, Altstadt, and Kneiphof into Königsberg in 1724 and the selection of Kneiphof Town Hall as the new city hall, Löbenicht's town hall was used by the city treasury.

The building had to be reconstructed after a conflagration on 11 November 1764. It was used subsequently rented by the brewery guilds and the bookseller Johann Jacob Kanter, who allowed Immanuel Kant to live in the mansard attic in 1769. It was purchased by the printer Gottlieb Leberecht Hartung in 1788, who used it to publish his newspaper, later known as the Königsberger Hartungsche Zeitung, the following year. The building was damaged again by fire in 1876. The Hartungsche Zeitung and the Königsberger Tageblatt were published in the former town hall until 1906, when it was damaged by fire and the printers moved to Münchenhofplatz between Löbenicht and Altstadt.

The building was destroyed by the 1944 Bombing of Königsberg and 1945 Battle of Königsberg.

== See also ==
- Altstadt Town Hall
- Kneiphof Town Hall
- Stadthaus
