= Altstadt Town Hall =

Town hall in Königsberg, Germany

Coordinates: 54.7102°N 20.5121°E

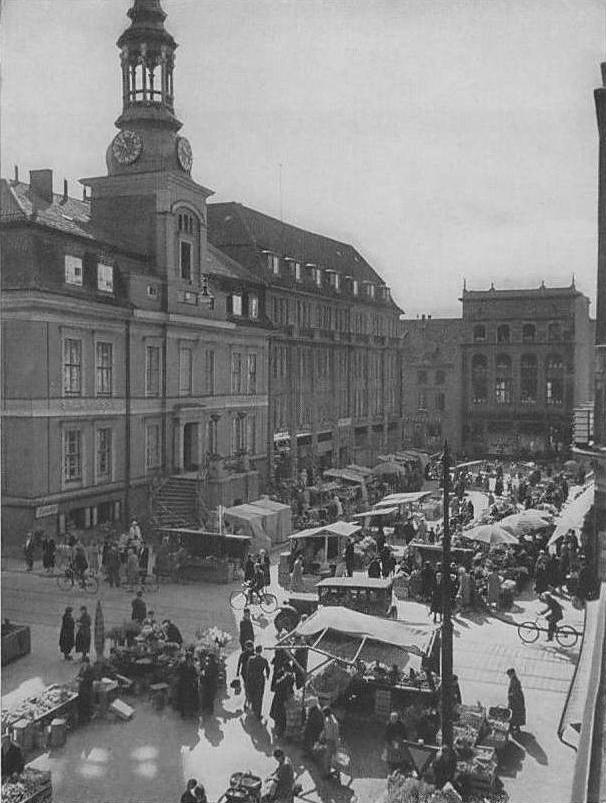
Altstädischer Markt with the town hall

Altstadt Town Hall (German: Altstädtisches Rathaus) was the town hall of Altstadt, first an independent town and later a quarter of Königsberg, Germany.

== History ==
The town hall was located along the Altstädtischer Markt, a market near the Pregel River. Its original construction date and style is unknown, but it was rebuilt in the Gothic style in 1528. It was then rebuilt in 1757 and had a tower added in 1765. It expanded with an annex along Schmiedestraße in 1832. The building contained works by the Königsberg-born sculptor Rudolf Siemering.

After the defeat of rebels in the neighboring Königsberg town of Kneiphof in 1455 during the Thirteen Years' War, the town hall was decorated with the first Japper, a mocking mask facing in the direction of Kneiphof. A bearded head was installed during the renovation of 1528; it included a mechanism which allowed a tongue to extend toward Kneiphof each hour. This was ruined in 1774 when a sparrow flew into the clockwork; the citizens of Kneiphof subsequently referred to their neighbors in Altstadt as Sperlingschlucker, or sparrow eaters. A third Japper depicting a golden lion's head was added during the 1832 expansion and became popular with children.

With the unification of the three towns into a single city in 1724 and the selection of the Kneiphof Town Hall as city hall, Altstadt's Rathaus instead hosted the Stadtgericht (city court). It also contained the Königsberg City Archive from 1724 to 1911 and the Königsberg Public Library from 1773 to 1810. Courses for the city's business school were held inside the town hall from 1907 to 1924. It also contained the city Sparkasse during the 1920s.

The Altstadt Town Hall was rebuilt after an internal fire on 6 March 1940, but was subsequently destroyed in August 1944 during the Bombing of Königsberg in World War II.

== Gallery ==
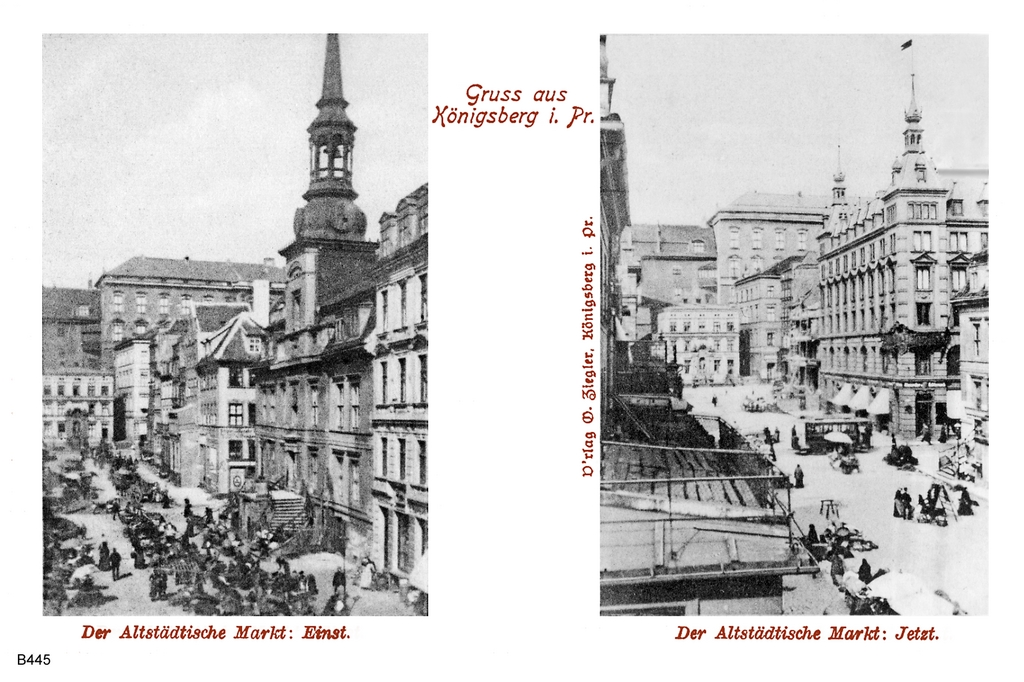
Postcards of Altstadt Town Hall

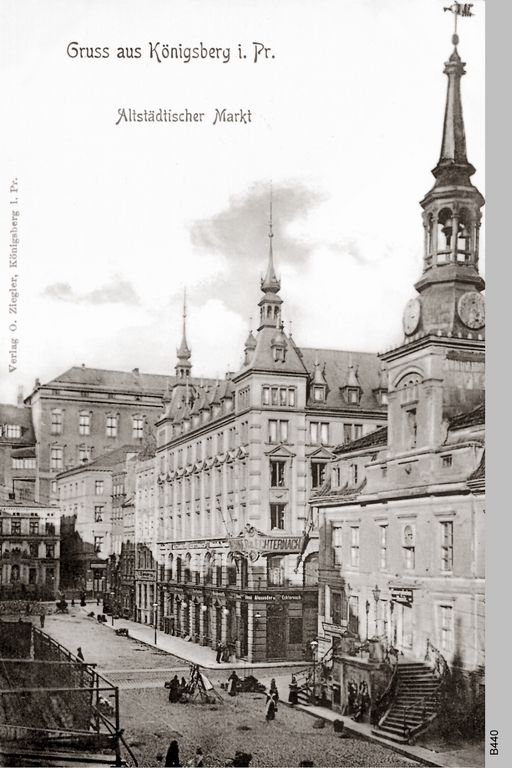
Postcard of Altstadt Town Hall

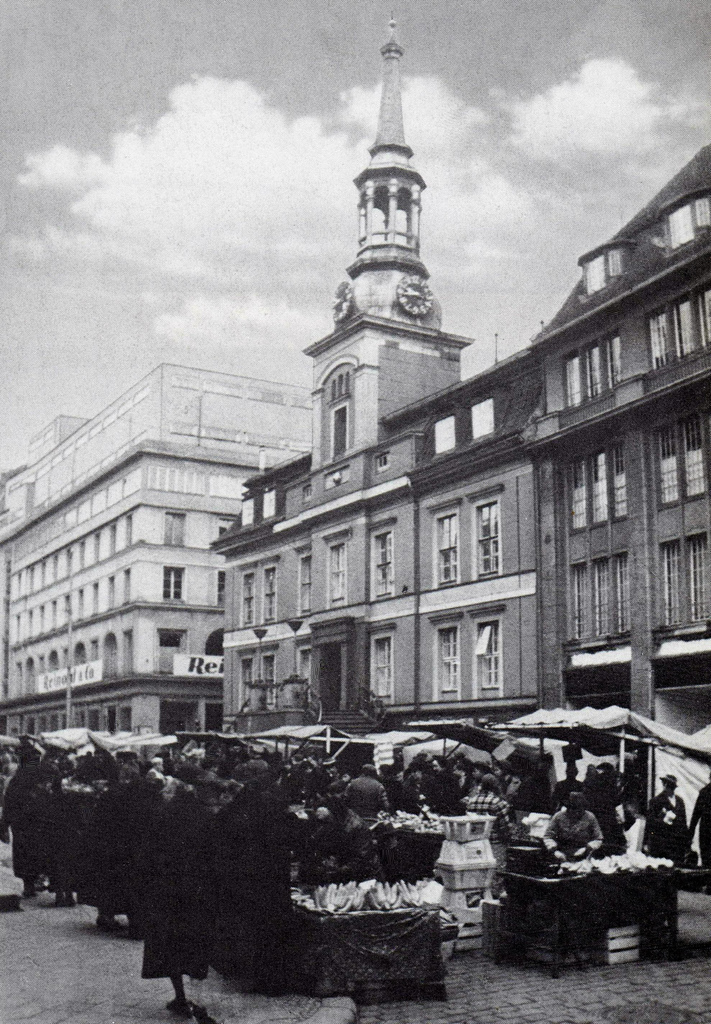
Altstädischer Markt with the town hall

== See also ==
- Kneiphof Town Hall
- Löbenicht Town Hall
- Stadthaus
