= Johann Funck =

German Lutheran theologian (1518–1566)

Johann Funck, Funk or Funccius (7 February 1518 – 28 October 1566) was a German Lutheran theologian. He was beheaded after a court intrigue.

== Life ==
Funck was born in Wöhrd, now part of Nuremberg. After obtaining an M.A. at the University of Wittenberg and preaching in several places, he was recommended to Albert, Duke of Prussia, by Veit Dietrich, and went to Königsberg (Królewiec) in 1547. Initially the pastor at Altstadt Church, Funck was made court preacher in 1549.

In the Osiandrian controversy, Funck sided with Andreas Osiander and Andreas Aurifaber who was physician in ordinary to the duke; when Osiander died in 1552, Funck delivered the eulogy. Joachim Mörlin, his main opponent, was obliged to leave Prussia in 1553. and Funck became the dominant representative of Osiander's theology. John Albert I, Duke of Mecklenburg, son-in-law of Duke Albert and a Lutheran, intrigued against Funck, who had to retract certain "heresies" at a synod held at Riesenburg (Prabuty) in 1556 and to promise to abide by the Augsburg Confession and the Loci Theologici of Melanchthon.

Funck still enjoyed favour at court, however. Aurifaber died in 1559, and Funck married his widow, Osiander's daughter; Funck was both the confessor and counsellor of the duke and treasurer of the duchess, but his position was exposed. An adventurer, Paul Skalich, took advantage of the aging duke; councillors belonging to the nobility were pushed aside. The Prussian estates, feeling that their rights were infringed, appealed to the suzerain of the country, King Sigismund II of Poland, who sent a commission in August 1566 to Königsberg to investigate the matter. Funck, together with the councillors Matthias Horst, Hans Schell, and Johann Steinbach, was charged with opposition to the ecclesiastical and political governance of the state. The Polish commission directed that the case be tried by the court in Kneiphof (Knipawa), Königsberg. Funck, Horst, and Schell were condemned and executed in the marketplace before Kneiphof Town Hall on 28 October 1566. Steinbach had to leave the duchy and Skalich escaped.

== Works ==
The works of Funck are:

- Chronologia ab urbe condita (2 vols., Königsberg, 1545–52);
- expositions of Psalms xlvi. (1548), ciii. (1549), and ix. (1551);
- Auszug und kurzer Bericht von der Gerechtigkeit der Christen für Gott (1552);
- Wahrhaftiger und grundlicher Bericht wie und was Gestalt die ägerliche Spaltung von der Gerechtigkeit des Glaubens sich anfänglich im Lande Preussen erhoben (1553);
- Der Patriarchen Lehre und Glauben (1554);
- Vier Predigten von der Rechtfertigung des Sünders durch den Glauben für Gott. Item: Kurtze Bekenntnis (1563).
