= Richard Armstedt =

German philologist, educator, and historian

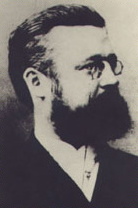
Richard Armstedt

Richard Armstedt (10 November 1851 – 14 April 1931) was a German philologist, educator, and historian.

Armstedt, a native of Osterburg, Prussian Saxony, received his doctorate in philosophy from the University of Tübingen in 1885. The following year he became senior instructor at Altstadt Gymnasium in Königsberg. From 1900-21 he was director of Königsberg's Kneiphof Gymnasium. He died in the same city.

Armstedt's scholarly work was focused on East Prussian history, especially that of Königsberg. He also wrote a history of the Königsberg Freemason lodge Zum Totenkopf und Phönix, of which he was a member.

== Selected works ==
- Heimatkunde von Königsberg i. Pr.. Königsberg 1895 (with Richard Fischer)
- Der schwedische Heiratsplan des Großen Kurfürsten. Königsberg 1896
- Geschichte der Königl. Haupt- und Residenzstadt Königsberg in Preußen. Stuttgart 1899. Nachdruck Melchior, Wolfenbüttel 2006
- Geschichte des Kneiphöfischen Gymnasiums zu Königsberg i. Pr. Königsberg 1913, 1914
- Geschichte der Vereinigten Johannis-Loge zum Totenkopf und Phönix zu Königsberg i. Pr. in den Jahren 1897–1922. Hartung, Königsberg 1922
