= Körte-Oberlyzeum =

- Königsberg; Germany

Information
- Type: Girls' gymnasium
- Established: 1925
- Closed: 1944

The Körte-Oberlyzeum was a girls' gymnasium in Königsberg, Germany. It was named after mayor Siegfried Körte.

== History ==
The Oberlyzeum was formed in 1925 when the city of Königsberg combined two private schools, the Seydel-Lyzeum of Theaterstraße in Burgfreiheit and the Günther-Lyzeum of Steindamm. The new institution was located in the former Altstadt Gymnasium, as that building had been vacated to form Stadtgymnasium Altstadt-Kneiphof. In 1935, the Maria-Krause-Lyzeum of Schnürlingstraße in Hintere Vorstadt was closed and merged into the Körte-Oberlyzeum. The school was destroyed during the 1944 bombing of Königsberg in World War II.
