= Theophilus Siegfried Bayer =

German sinologst (1694–1738)

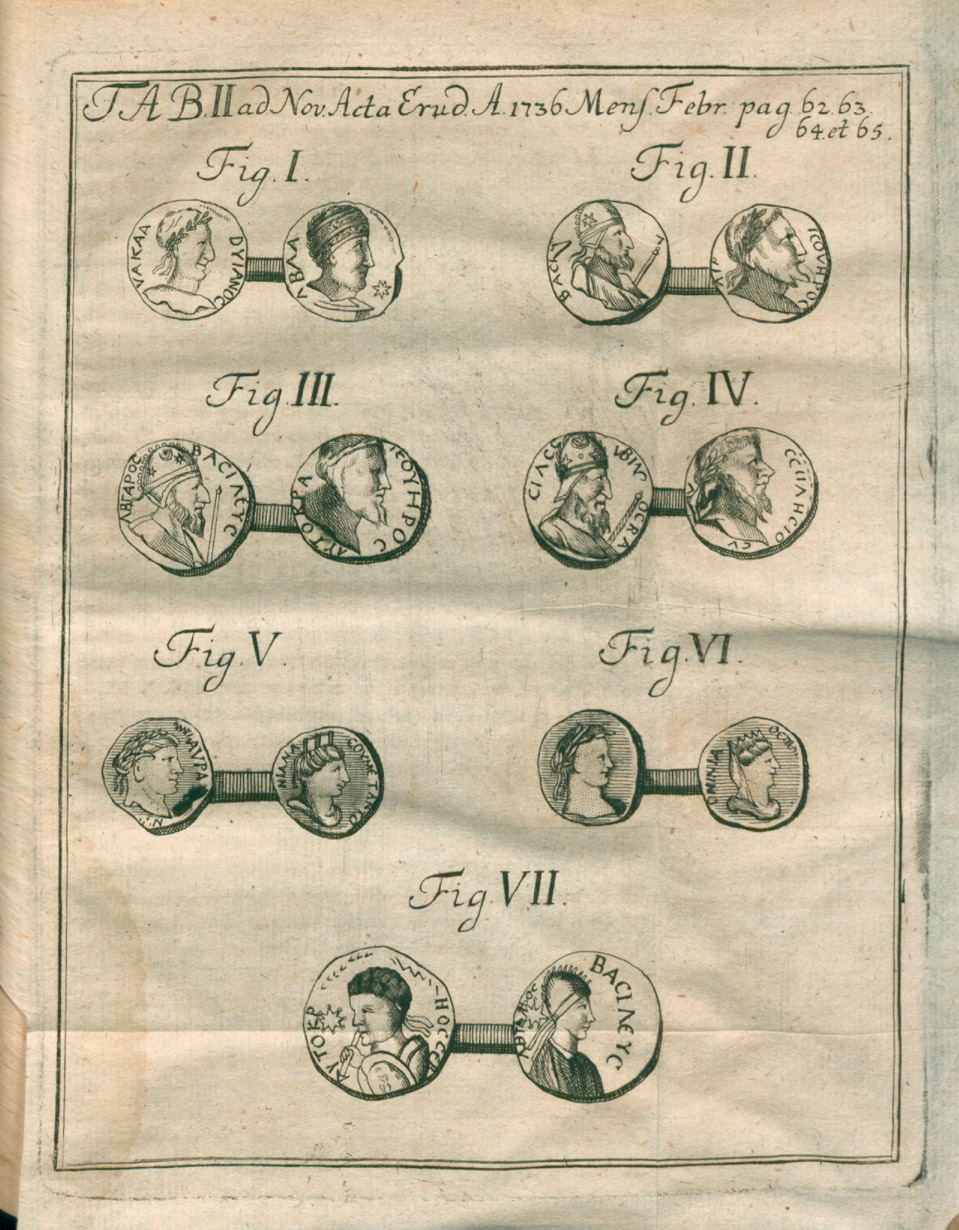
Illustration for the article on Historia Osrhoena et Edessena ex numis illustrata by Theophilus Siegfried Bayer published in the 1736 volume of Acta Eruditorum

Theophilus (Gottlieb) Siegfried Bayer (1694–1738) was a German classical scholar with specialization in Sinology. He was a Sinologist and professor of Greek and Roman Antiquities at St Petersburg Academy of Sciences between 1726 and 1737.

== Personal details ==
Bayer was a native of Königsberg, then in the Duchy of Prussia. His father Johann Friedrich was from the German Protestant minority in Hungary, but had moved to the Duchy of Prussia, where he worked as a painter. The youthful T. S. Bayer was an excellent student at the University of Königsberg, studying Latin, Greek and Hebrew. He was a Rector of the Königsberg Cathedral from 1721 to 1726, and also worked as a librarian at the Königsberg Public Library.

== Bayer collection ==
He had a library of more than 200 manuscripts, Chinese and other Oriental books, including:

- Telugu and Tamil Palm-leaf manuscripts
- Oriental history and philology-related notes
- Correspondence with Jesuits in Peking.

After his death in Saint Petersburg his widow handed over his books and papers to the academy authorities, receiving the rest of her husband's pay due that year. The library was later sold to a Lutheran pastor in London, Heinrich Walter Gerdes. William Hunter later purchased the collection from Gerdes' widow. It finally reached the University of Glasgow in 1807 with a brief stay in London with Dr Matthew Baillie, Hunter's nephew.

== Works ==
- Historia regni Graecorum bactriani [A History of the Kingdom of the Bactrian Greeks].
- Manuscript in Latin and Chinese.
- De Eclipsi Sinica published in 1718.
- Museum Sinicum, a two-volume compendium of materials on the Chinese language published in 1730 (Google Books: volume 1, volume 2).
- Works on the history of Russia, including De Varagis (1729) and Origines russicae (1736).

== Sources ==
- "Байер, Готлиб-Зигфрид" . Brockhaus and Efron Encyclopedic Dictionary (in Russian). 1906.
