= Bukowiec, Bartoszyce County =

Bukowiec
- Village
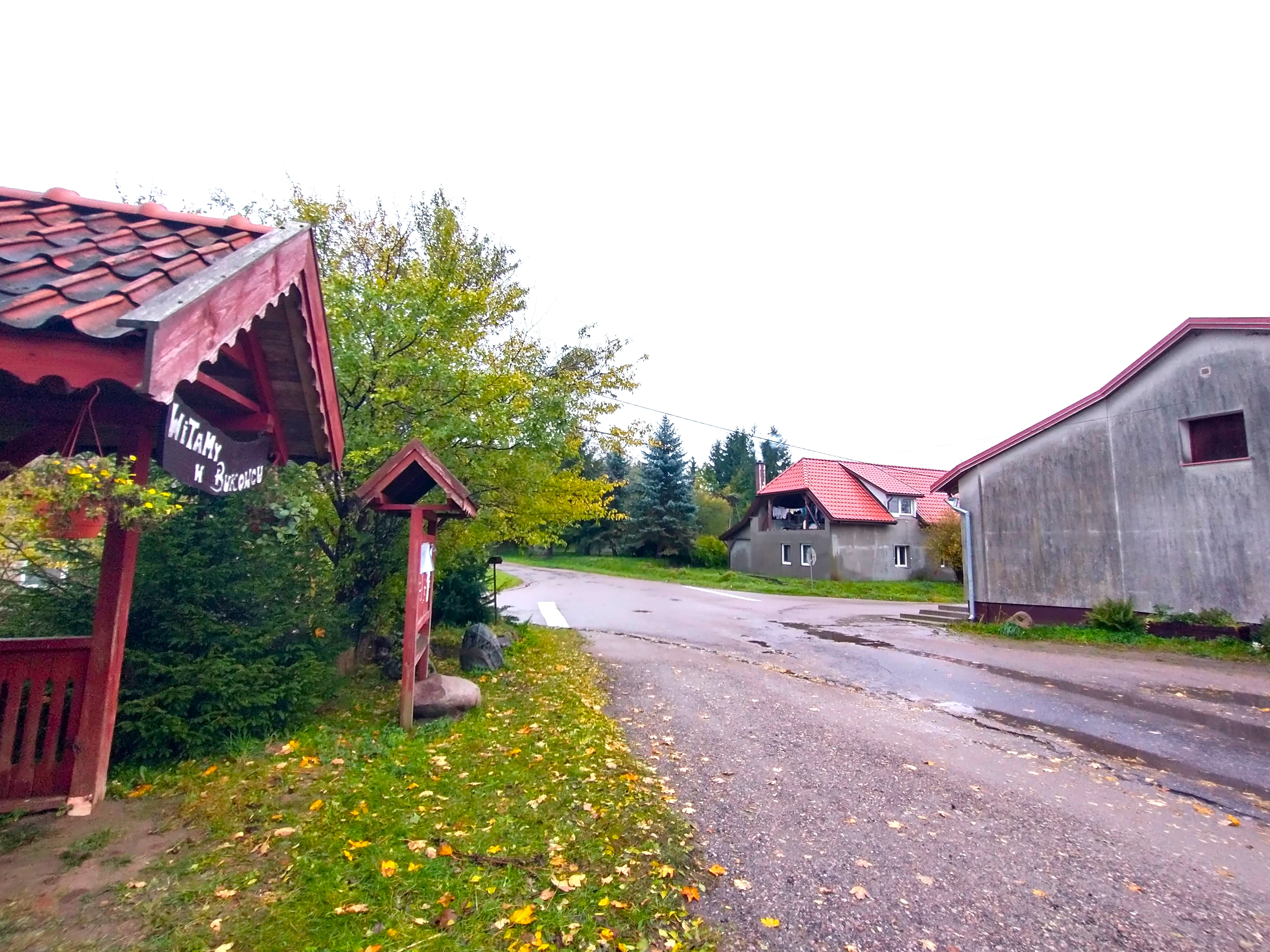

- Location within Poland
- Coordinates: 54°17′22″N 20°24′5″E
- Country: Poland
- Voivodeship: Warmian-Masurian
- County: Bartoszyce
- Gmina: Górowo Iławeckie

Population
  - Total: 780
- Time zone: UTC+1 (CET)
  - Summer (DST): UTC+2 (CEST)
- Vehicle registration: NBA

Bukowiec [buˈkɔvjɛt͡s] (German: Buchholz) is a village in the administrative district of Gmina Górowo Iławeckie, within Bartoszyce County, Warmian-Masurian Voivodeship, in northern Poland, close to the border with the Kaliningrad Oblast of Russia.

From 1959 to 1961 it was administratively located in the Górowo County in the Olsztyn Voivodeship.

== Notable residents ==
- Gotthilf Christoph Wilhelm Busolt (1771–1831), German scholar

== Population ==
- 1933: 603
- 1939: 587
