= Coat of arms of Kaliningrad =

- Armiger: City of Kaliningrad
- Adopted: 1996
- Shield: A silver sailing ship with the Russian Navy Ensign on the top, the coat of arms of Königsberg in the middle, and twelve golden dots at the bottom

Flag of Kaliningrad
- The Kaliningrad flag is the shield, but with the field colored the same as the shield's background, and with the border removed
- Proportion: 2:3
- Adopted: 17 July 1996

The coat of arms of Kaliningrad is the official heraldic achievement of the city of Kaliningrad in Russia. The flag of Kaliningrad is the official flag of Kaliningrad.

== History ==
The coat of arms and flag were adopted by the Duma on 17 July 1996, in Decision No. 219.

== Description ==
The arms displays a medieval ship for the harbour on the Baltic Sea, which has been important for the city since its foundation in the Middle Ages. The ship is flying a trianglular swallowtail pennant resembling the Russian Navy Ensign (a white pennant with a blue St. Andrew's Cross) on the top of the mast.

In the middle is an inescutcheon with the old smaller arms of the city, used when it was called Königsberg (it changed names in 1946, following its seizure by the Soviet Union from Germany). Königsberg is German for "King's Mountain"; the crown may be a symbol for the king. The adjacent towns of Kneiphof and Neustadt Königsberg (originally called Löbenicht) were merged with Königsberg in 1724, and their three shields were often used together during the following time, supported by the Prussian eagle.

The city uses a flag which is a banner of arms, meaning the flag is simply the seal with the background color extended.

== Gallery ==
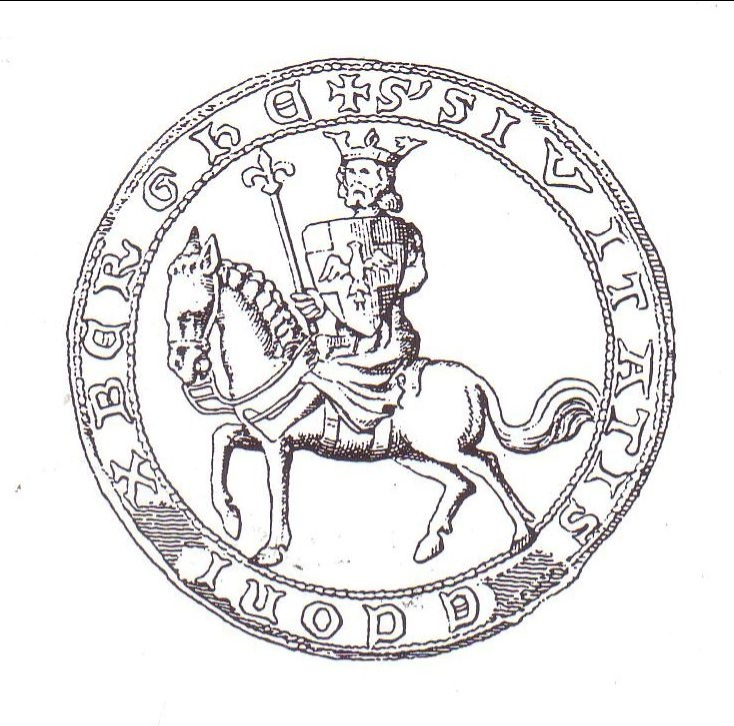
The oldest seal of Königsberg with an image of king Ottokar II of Bohemia, 1360

Old arms of Königsberg (1724–1945). On the sides are the arms of Kneiphof (dexter) and Löbenicht/Neustadt Königsberg (sinister)

Coat of Arms of Altstadt (Königsberg)

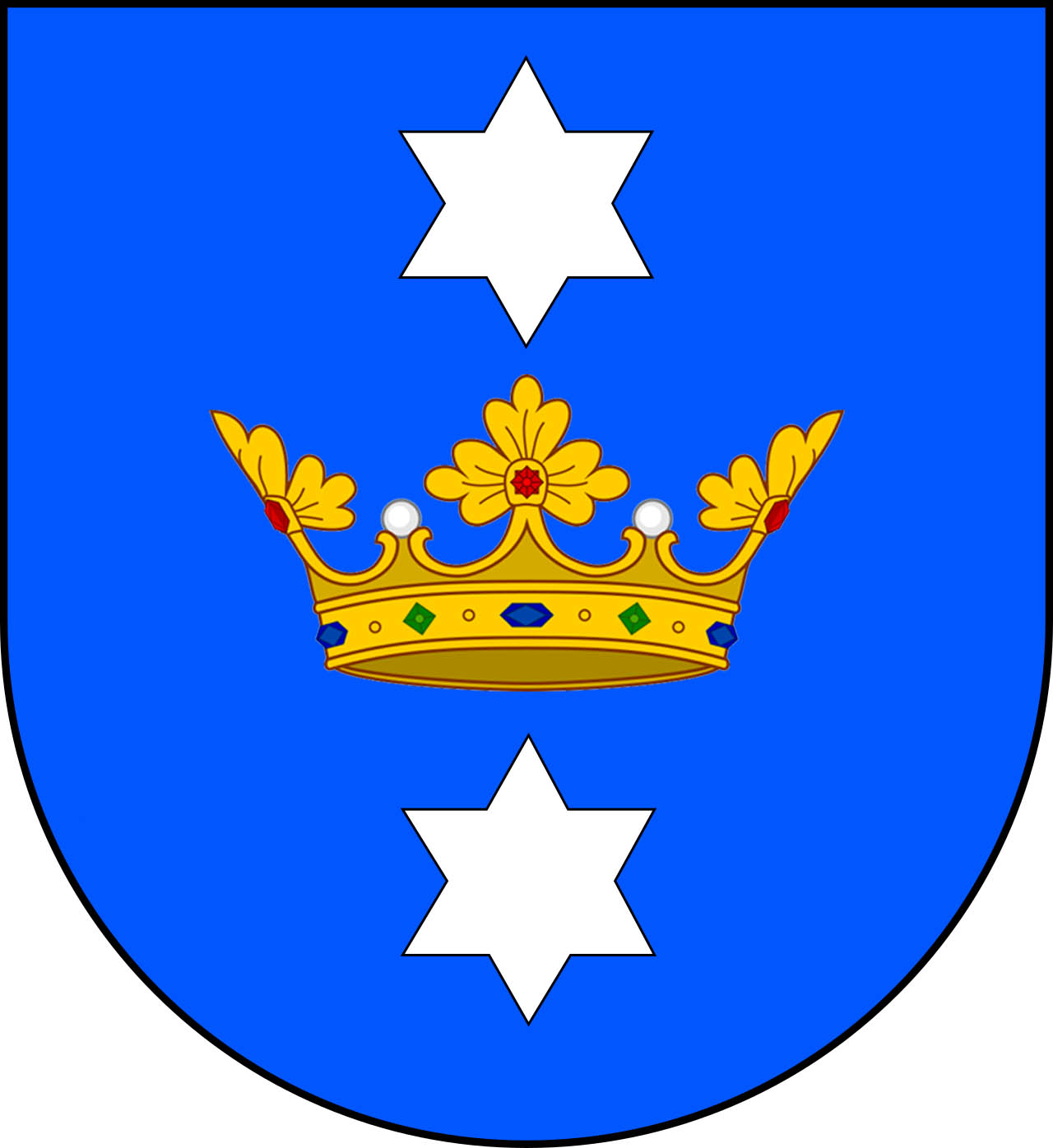
Coat of Arms of Löbenicht (Neustadt Königsberg)

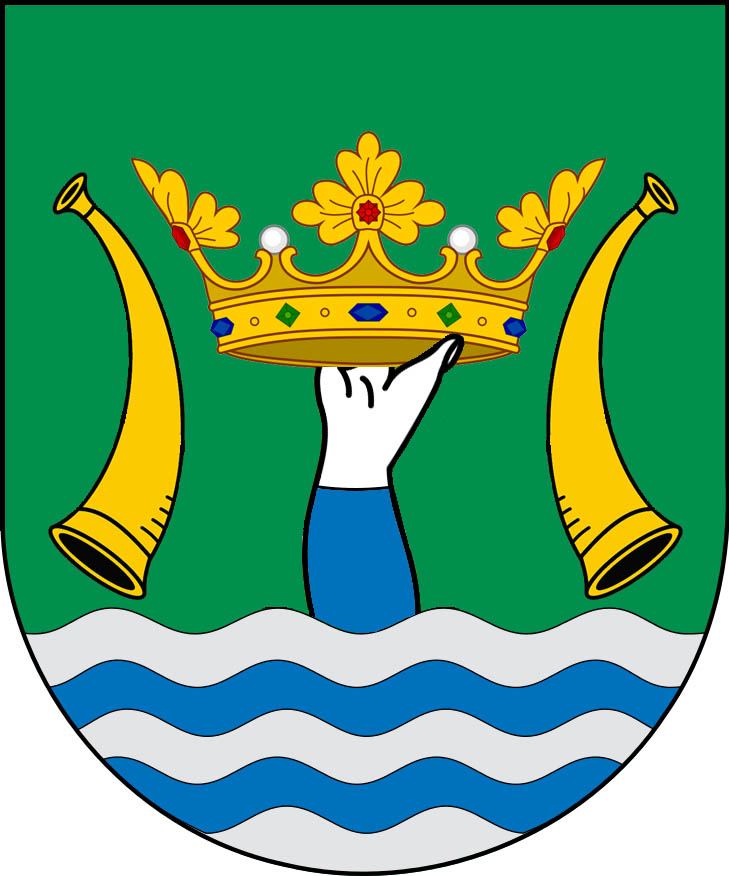
Coat of Arms of Kneiphof

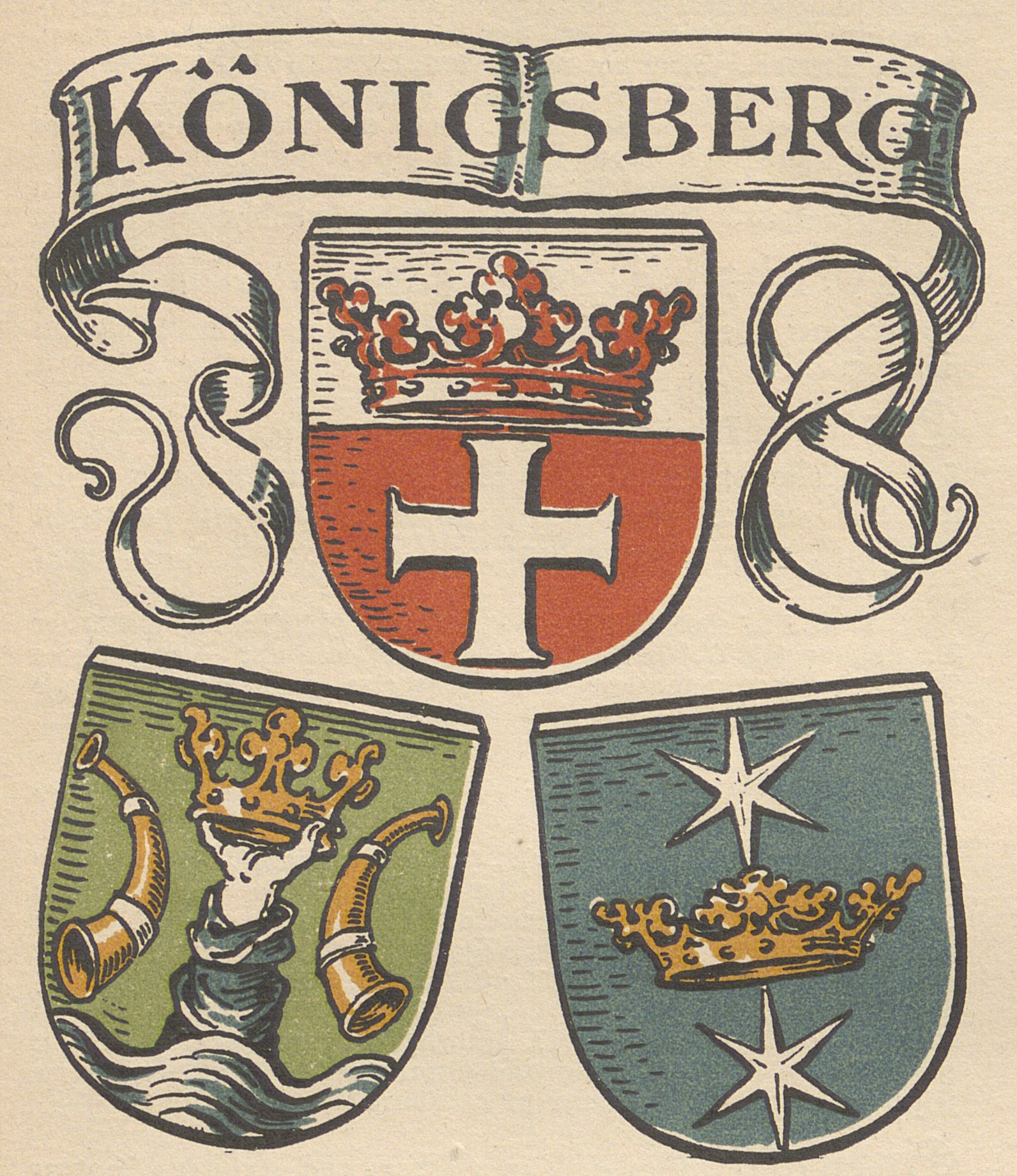
Old arms of Königsberg, Otto Hupp 1896

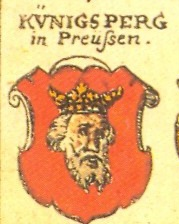
Old arms of Königsberg (Kv̈nigsperg in Preußen) in roll of arms made by Johann Siebmacher, 1605
