= Königsberg City Archive =

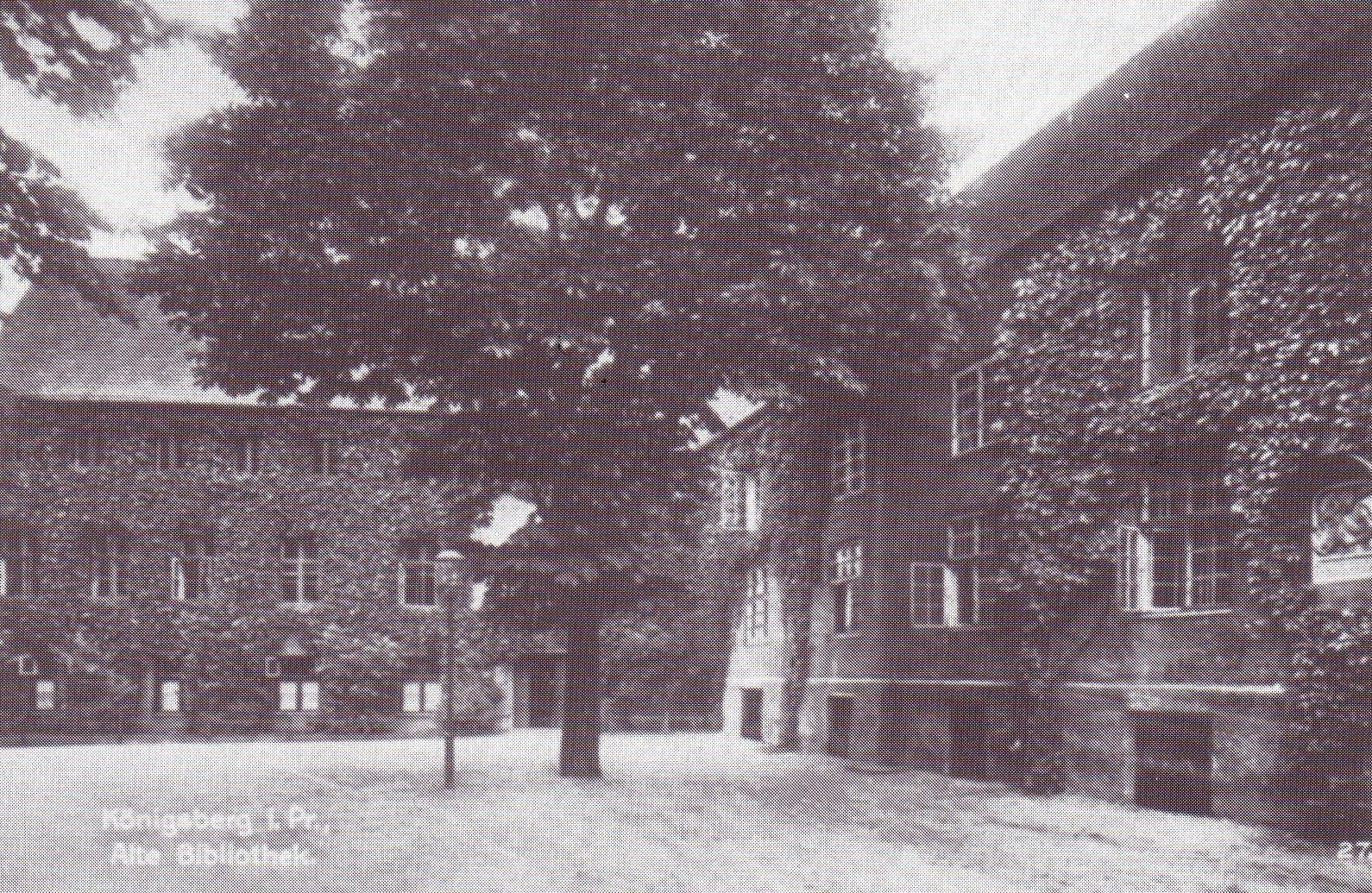
City Archive and Public Library in Kneiphof

The Königsberg City Archive (German: Stadtarchiv Königsberg) was the municipal archive of Königsberg, Germany.

The towns of Altstadt, Kneiphof, and Löbenicht were united to form the city of Königsberg in 1724. The city's archives were subsequently located in Altstadt Town Hall, but moved to the original campus of the University of Königsberg in Kneiphof in 1911/12. Its directors included August Wittich (1875 to 1897), Ernst Seraphim (1911), Christian Krollmann (1924), and Fritz Gause (1938).

The Nazi Party did not take an interest in the archive during Gleichschaltung. However, Gauleiter Erich Koch prevented the archive from being evacuated in 1944 during World War II. It was subsequently destroyed by the 1944 bombing of Königsberg and the 1945 Battle of Königsberg.
