= Johann Jakob Quandt =

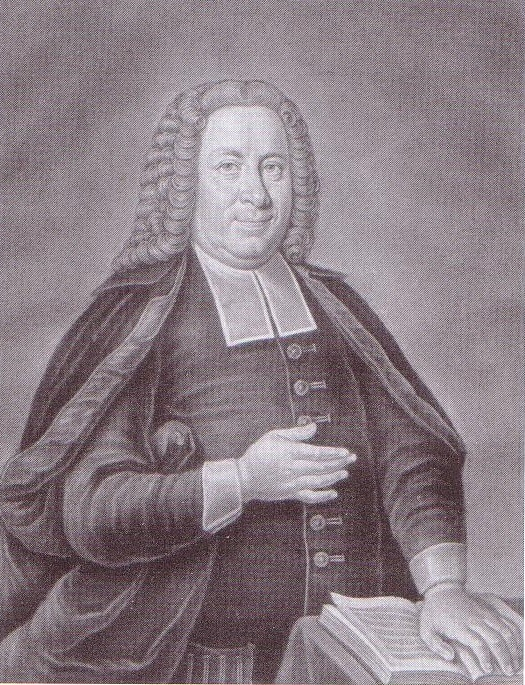
Johann Jakob Quandt

Johann Jakob Quandt (German: [kvant]; Lithuanian: Jonas Jokūbas Kvantas; 27 March 1686, Königsberg – 17 January 1772, Königsberg) was a German orthodox Lutheran theologian, pastor, and professor of theology at the University of Königsberg.

== Life ==
He studied under Paul Rabe at the University of Königsberg and earned a doctorate in theology from the University of Rostock in 1715.

Quandt opposed Pietism, but sympathized with Wolffianism. He is known for sponsoring the first complete translation of the Bible into Lithuanian, the Quandt Bible of 1735. He was also a librarian of the Königsberg Public Library (first librarian, 1714–18).

He was considered an excellent preacher. Frederick the Great called him the best preacher he knew. In 1743 he published a hymnal in response to Georg Friedrich Rogall's Pietist hymnal.
