= Gotthilf Christoph Wilhelm Busolt =

German educator (1771–1831)

- Born: 6 February 1771; Buchholz, East Prussia, Prussia (now Bukowiec, Poland)
- Died: 3 May 1831 (aged 60); Königsberg, East Prussia, Prussia (now Kaliningrad, Russia)
- Occupation: Educator
- Spouse: Louise Gramatzki

Gotthilf Christoph Wilhelm Busolt (6 February 1771 – 3 May 1831) was a German educator. He is known for his transcripts of Immanuel Kant's lectures at the University of Königsberg and his influence on the Prussian educational reforms.

== Life ==
Christoph Wilhelm Busolt was born in Buchholz, East Prussia (Bukowiec, Poland), the son of the local pastor Gotthilf Friedrich Busolt and Susanna née Kerstein.

He started to study at the University of Königsberg (Kaliningrad) in 1788, where he attended lectures of Christian Jakob Kraus and Immanuel Kant. Busolt's transcript of Kant's lectures are known as the "Busolt logic". Busolt passed his doctorate exam in 1798.

He became a teacher at the Altstadt Gymnasium and a charity school (Tiepoltsche Armenschule) in Königsberg. He was largely influenced by the pedagogic ideas of Johann Heinrich Pestalozzi. Busolt left Königsberg in 1798 to travel through Germany and visit several schools and learn about their different pedagogic concepts. In 1800 he returned to Königsberg and became a member of the church and school commissions.

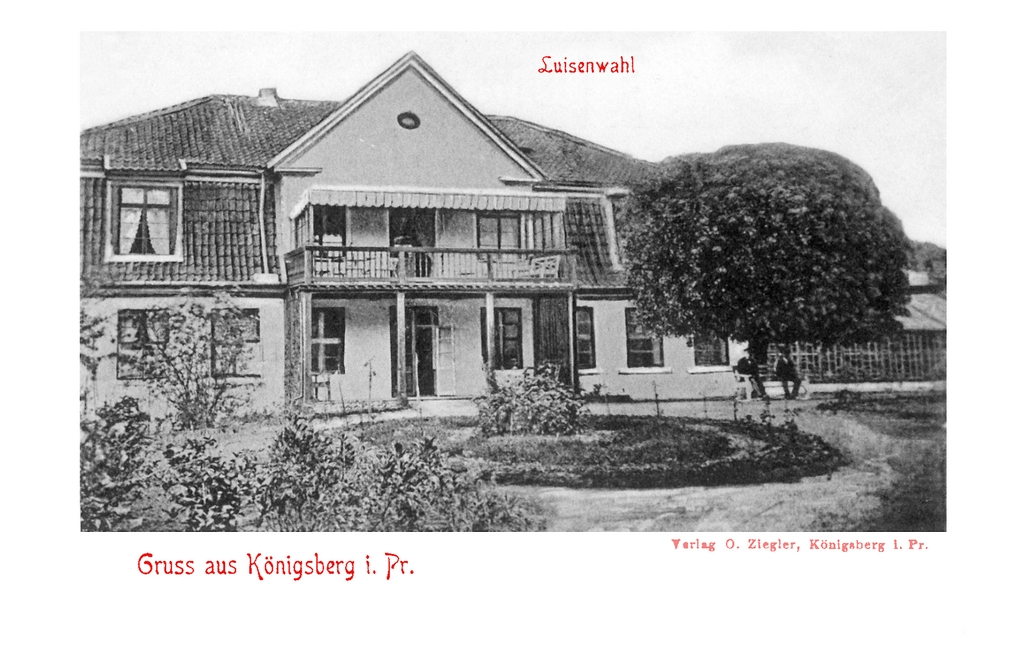
Busolt's estate of Louisenwahl (ca.1908)

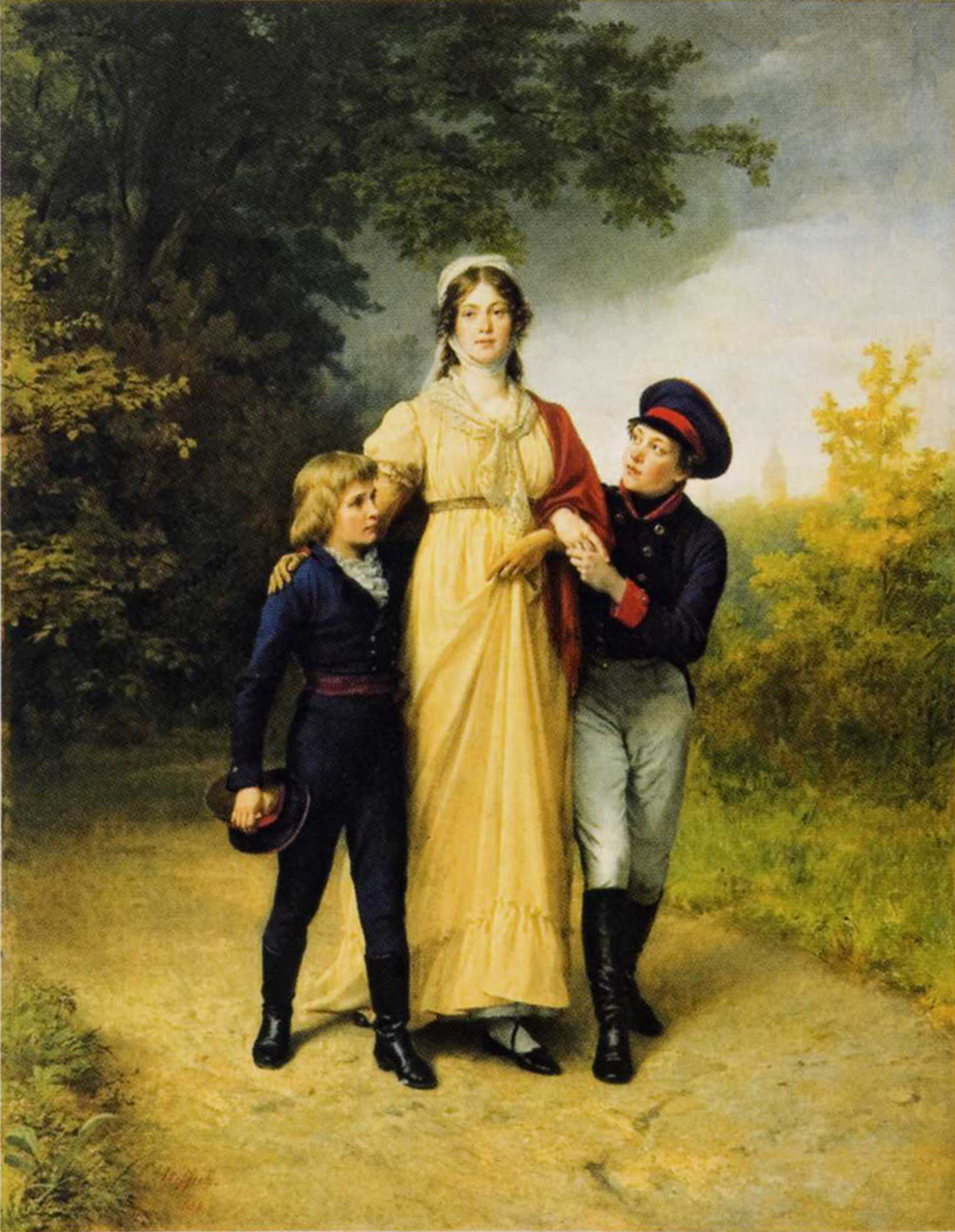
Louise of Prussia with the Princes William and Frederick William at Louisenwahl, 1808

After the death of Theodor Gottlieb von Hippel the Elder Busalt purchased Hippel's estate just outside Königsberg which he named Louisenwahl after his wife. In the summer of 1808 and 1809 King Frederick William III of Prussia, Louise of Prussia and their children, the Princes William and Frederick William resided in Luisenwahl. When Napoleon reached Königsberg in June 1812 Louisenwahl was regarded too miserable for a king ("Miserable chateau pour un roi")

Busolt became a member of Königsberg's city parliament in 1809 and member of the school reform commission headed by Wilhelm von Humboldt. Busolt gave lectures about modern pedagogy, which were attended by the Prussian King and Queen and Humboldt. Throughout the period of Prussian reforms August Neidhardt von Gneisenau lived for several month at Busolt's home.

Busolt died in Königsberg on 3 May 1831.
