= Altstadt Gymnasium =

Altstadt Gymnasium German: Altstädtisches Gymnasium
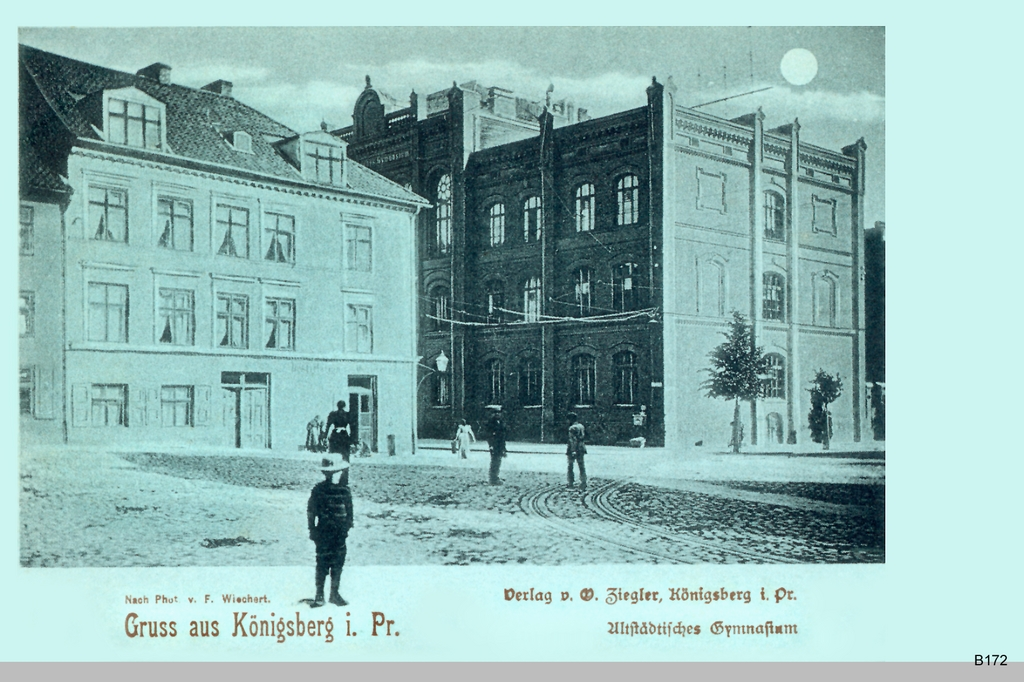

Information
- Religious affiliation(s): Altstadt Church
- Established: c.1333
- Closed: 1923 (merged with Kneiphof Gymnasium to form the Stadtgymnasium Altstadt-Kneiphof)
- Enrollment: 437 (1907)

Altstadt Gymnasium (German: Altstädtisches Gymnasium) was a German secondary school in the Altstadt quarter of Königsberg, Germany.

== History ==
A parochial school (schola parochialis) was established ca. 1333 or 1335 by the original Altstadt Church. Disputes between Altstadt and Kneiphof over where students should attend classes were common, however. Grand Master Dietrich von Altenburg decided that students in northern Altstadt would attend the school in Altstadt, while students in southern Altstadt would attend school in Kneiphof; every two years the classes would switch schools. By 1381, however, students from all of Altstadt attended only the parochial school.

By 1487 the school had moved to the street Danziger Keller near Königsberg Castle. The parochial school was expanded into a Latin school in 1525 during the Protestant Reformation. Because sunlight at the Danziger Keller building was partially blocked by one of the castle's towers, Altstadt's council approved the construction of a replacement school at Altstädtischer Kirchplatz (the later Kaiser-Wilhelm-Platz). The new school was built from 1592 to 1595 and dedicated on 14 August 1595. It hosted the Königsberg Public Library from 1737 to 1773.

Altstadt's school was reorganized as a humanistic gymnasium separate from Altstadt Church in 1811 and was then known as the Städtisches Gymnasium or Stadt-Gymnasium (municipal gymnasium). In the summer of 1826 classes were temporarily held at Roßgärter Markt while the original Altstadt Church was being dismantled. Altstadt's school was renamed Altstadt Gymnasium in 1831 when Kneiphof's school was reorganized as another municipal gymnasium, Kneiphof Gymnasium.

Classes were temporarily held in Oberlaak starting in March 1846 while the 16th century school was rebuilt and modernized. The renovated school at Altstädtischer Kirchplatz was rededicated on 12 April 1847. The three-storied building contained eight classrooms, a library, a laboratory, an auditorium, a conference room, and the director's residence. Altstadt Gymnasium moved again in Easter 1889 to a new structure in place of the dismantled Pulverturm on Altstädtische Langgasse. It was designed by the Stadtbaurat Julius Krüger and cost 335,257 Mark. The walls of its hall were decorated with images of the Ancient Olympic Games by the painters Ernst Bischoff-Kulm and Emil Dörstling. The sons of Königsberg's higher educated Jews, such as lawyers, doctors, and journalists, often attended Altstadt Gymnasium, while the sons of Jewish merchants were more likely to attend Kneiphof Gymnasium.

Altstadt Gymnasium had 119 students in 1541, approximately 300 students in 1670, 479 students in 1878, and 437 students in 1907. It was merged with Kneiphof Gymnasium to form the combined Stadtgymnasium Altstadt-Kneiphof on 6 January 1923, with classes held in Kneiphof instead of Altstadt. The former Altstadt building was subsequently used in 1925 by the Körte-Lyzeum. It was destroyed during the 1944 bombing of Königsberg in World War II.

== Notable people ==
=== Faculty ===
- Georg Bujack (1838-1891), historian
- Gotthilf Christoph Wilhelm Busolt (1771–1831), pedagogue
- Emil Dörstling (1859-1940), painter
- Georg Lejeune-Dirichlet (1858-1920), pedagogue
- Eduard Loch (1868–1945), philologist
- Julius Rupp (1809-1884), theologian
- Max Sellnick (1884–1971), biologist

=== Students ===
- Siegfried Heinrich Aronhold (1819-1884), mathematician
- Georg Bender (1848-1924), politician
- Carl Bulcke (1875-1936), writer
- Hermann Eilsberger (1837-1908), theologian
- Julius Ellinger (1817-1881), mathematician
- Johann Funk (1792-1867), pastor
- Otto Gisevius (1821-1871), jurist
- Ernst August Hagen (1797-1880), writer
- Otto Hesse (1811-1874), mathematician
- Reinhold Bernhard Jachmann (1767-1843), theologian
- Robert Jaensch (1817–1892), mathematician
- Harry Liedtke (1882-1945), actor
- Friedrich Julius Richelot (1808-1875), mathematician
- Ernst Reinhold Schmidt (1819–1901), German-American leader
- Heinrich Schröter (1829-1902), mathematician
- Otto Schumann (1805-1869), jurist
- Walter Simon (1857-1920), philanthropist
- Arnold Sommerfeld (1868-1951), physicist
- Paul Stettiner (1862-1941), philologist
- Hans Widera (1887-1972), jurist
- Carl Witt (1815-1891), philologist
