= Königsberg Public Library =

Library in Königsberg, Germany

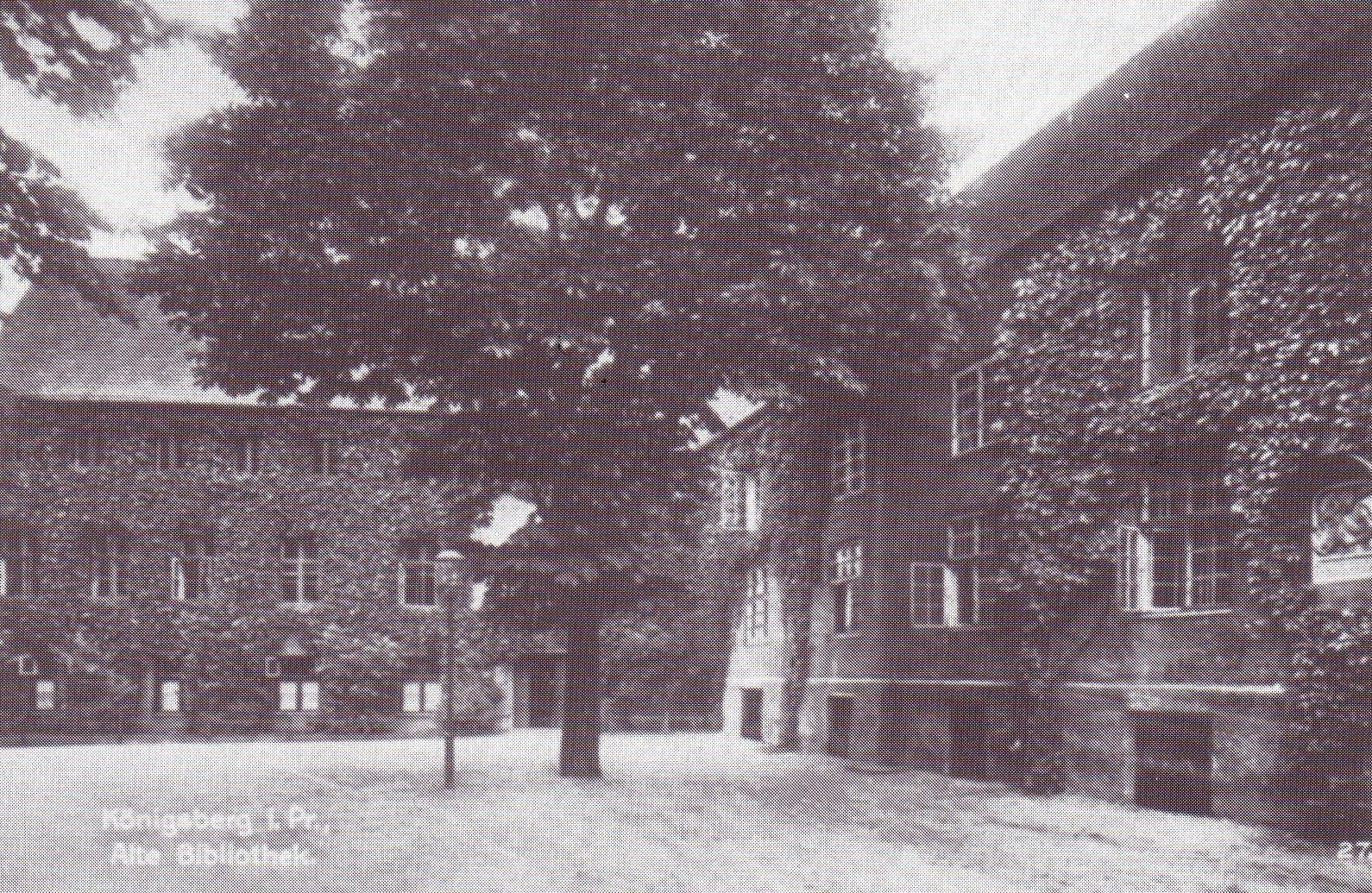
Public Library and Archive in Kneiphof

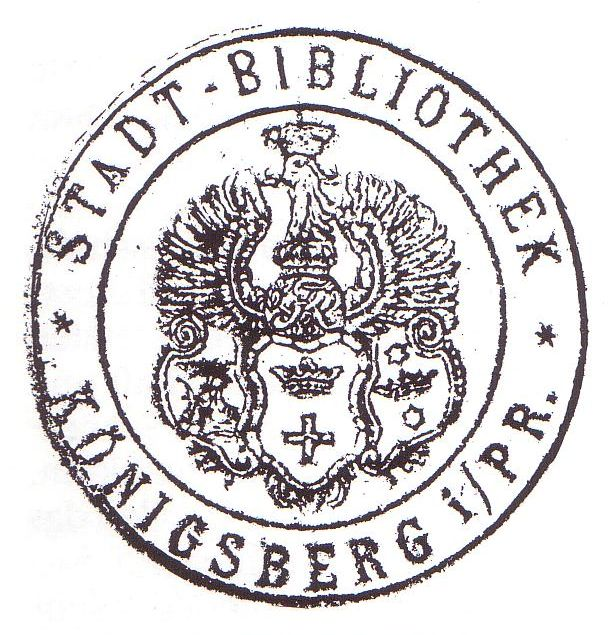
Stamp of the library

The Königsberg Public Library (German: Stadtbibliothek Königsberg) was a public library in Königsberg, Germany.

== Background ==
The library developed from the personal collection of Johannes Poliander, who donated it to the town council of Altstadt in 1541. J. Lomoller donated 300 predominantly legal works in 1594. It was housed in Altstadt's pauper house after its construction in 1628. To it was added the collection of vice-mayor Heinrich Bartsch (1627–1702). His son, city secretary Heinrich Bartsch Jr., created a librarian position in 1714, made the collection public in 1718, and added his own Bible collection. The first librarians were Johann Jakob Quandt and Gottlieb Siegfried Bayer.

The library moved from the pauper house to the Altstadt Latin school in 1737 and then to the Altstadt Town Hall in 1773. In 1810 it moved to the Königshaus in Neue Sorge, which also housed the royal and university libraries at the same time. Theodor Gottlieb von Hippel the Younger donated another collection in 1837.

== Into the 20th Century ==
By the second half of the 19th century, the public library was disorganized and in financial difficulties. It moved to the old campus of the University of Königsberg in Kneiphof in 1875 and was administered by August Wittich from 1875 to 1897. The councilor August Wilhelm Hensche donated his private collection in 1889. When the magistrate considered closing the library, Wittich focused on reorganizing the library and hiring a chief librarian, Ernst Seraphim. Seraphim energetically developed the library after Wittich's 1897 death and had the library rebuilt. Rudolf Reicke donated 2,150 volumes to the library in 1907. Two years later Seraphim and the library began publishing seven volumes of scientific publications with the title Mitteilungen.

== Directors and destruction ==
Directors of the library included pastor Michael Lilienthal (1728 to 1748), Christian Jakob Kraus (1786 to 1804), Friedrich Adolf Meckelburg (1844 to 1875), August Wittich (1875 to 1897), Ernst Seraphim (from 1900), Christian Krollmann (from 1923), and Fritz Gause (from 1938). In 1939 the library contained 106,000 volumes. The Königsberg Public Library was destroyed in August 1944 during the Bombing of Königsberg in World War II.
