= Kneiphof Town Hall =

Coordinates: 54.7064°N 20.5086°E

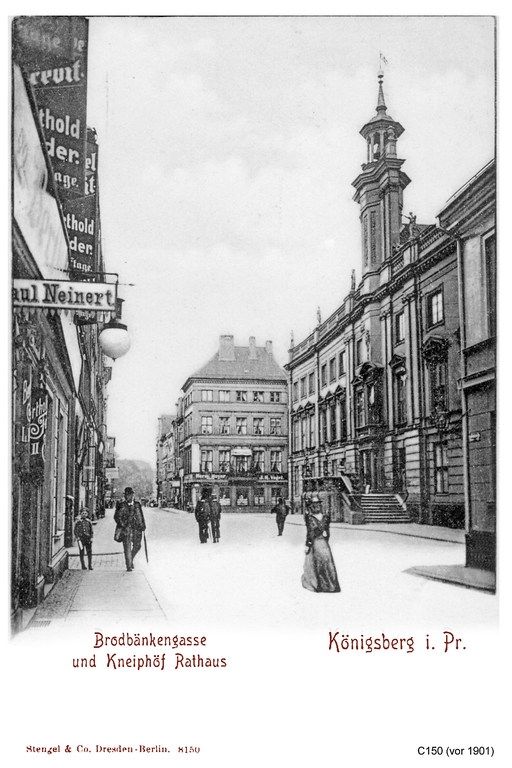
Postcard depicting the town hall and Brodbänkenstraße, ca. 1908

Kneiphof Town Hall (German: Kneiphöfisches Rathaus) was the town hall of insular Kneiphof, first an independent town and later a quarter of Königsberg, Germany. It served as Königsberg's city hall from 1724 to 1927, after which it became a museum until its destruction in 1944.

== History ==
The town hall, or Rathaus, was located along Brodbänkenstraße. First documented in 1374, it was renovated in 1387. Political and religious disputes between the Prussian estates and ducal Prussian officials during the 1560s led to involvement by King Sigismund II Augustus of Poland, sovereign of the Duchy of Prussia. On 28 October 1566 Albert I, Duke of Prussia, had the councilors Johann Funck, Matthias Horst, and Hans Schnell beheaded at the town hall's marketplace, with Johann Steinbach and Paul Skalich fleeing the country.

From 1695 to 1697 the town hall received a Baroque restyling with pilasters, bell tower, roof sculptures, and a gilded staircase with a pair of shield-holding bear statues. With the unification of Kneiphof, Altstadt, and Löbenicht into Königsberg in 1724, the Kneiphof Town Hall was chosen as the city hall. In 1838 the building was expanded to the east with three windows. The magister's hall was decorated with a stucco roof by an unknown master. The city council met in the Junkersaal wing. Before the building was a monument of Hans von Sagan.

In 1927 the city administration moved to the Stadthaus in northern Königsberg, with a few departments remaining in Kneiphof. In the same year the painter Eduard Anderson advocated for the creation of the Königsberg City Museum within the town hall, which opened in 1928.

The Kneiphof Town Hall was destroyed in August 1944 during the Bombing of Königsberg in World War II.

== Gallery ==
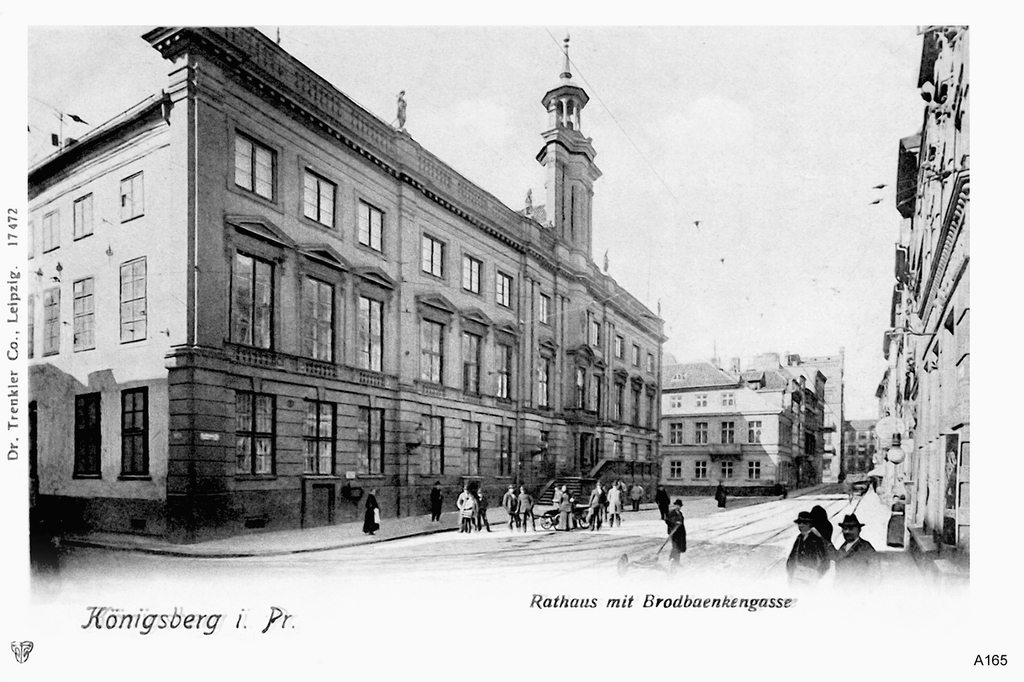
Postcard depicting the town hall and Brodbänkenstraße, ca. 1907

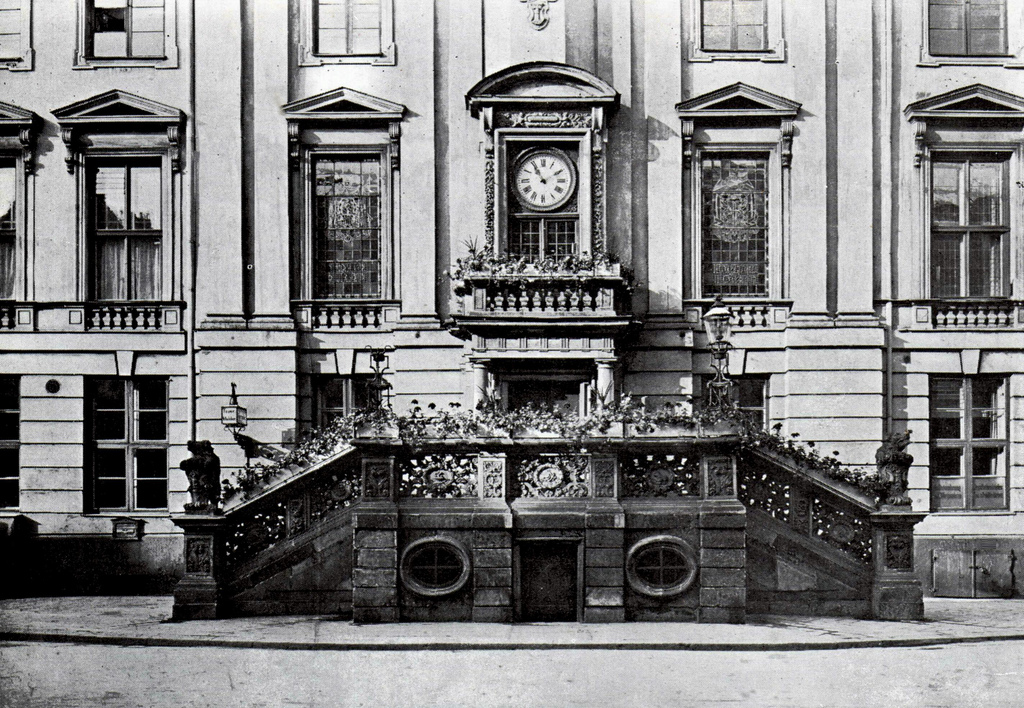
Facade of the town hall

== See also ==
- Altstadt Town Hall
- Löbenicht Town Hall
- Stadthaus
