= Kneiphof Gymnasium =

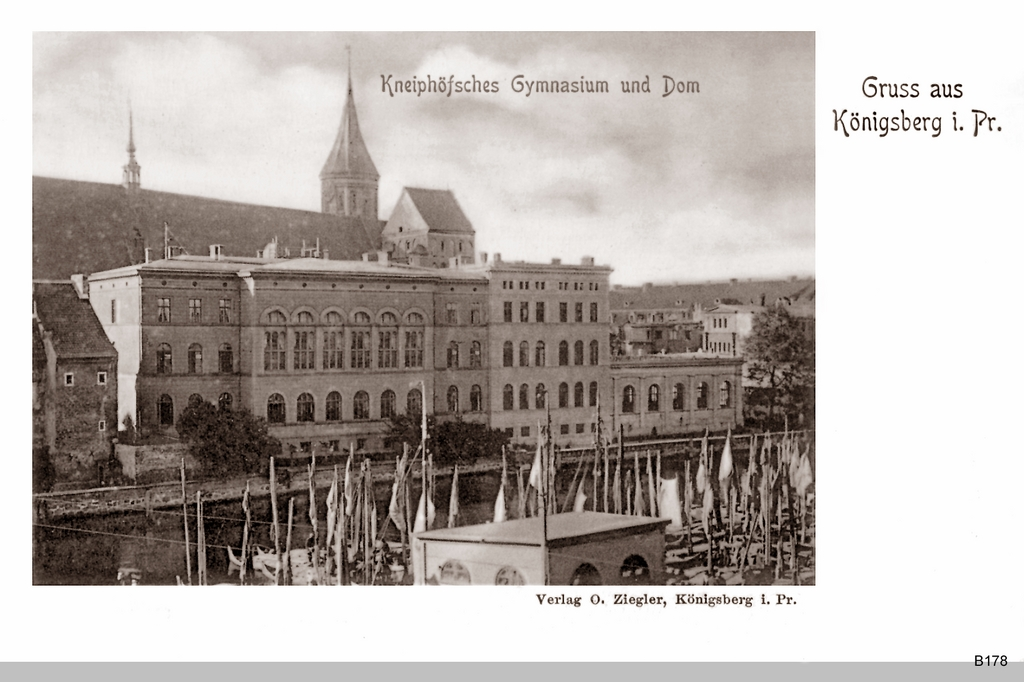
Kneiphof Gymnasium, with Königsberg Cathedral in the background

Kneiphof Gymnasium (German: Kneiphöfisches Gymnasium) was a gymnasium in the Kneiphof quarter of Königsberg, Germany.

== History ==
A cathedral school, the schola cathedralis or Domschule, was established on Heiligengeistgasse in Altstadt in 1304. After construction of Königsberg Cathedral began on the island of Kneiphof in 1333, the school was relocated north of the new cathedral.

The school was separated from the cathedral in 1528 during the Reformation, with oversight passing to Kneiphof's town council. The Protestant theologian Martin Chemnitz taught at the school before receiving his degree from the University of Königsberg in 1548. It was occupied by students protesting the appointment of Johann Campinge as director in 1554. Kneiphof's school was relocated south of the cathedral in 1560. The poet Simon Dach served as deputy headmaster from 1633 to 1639. A building for poor students was constructed nearby in 1644.

Kneiphof's Latin school was reorganized as a Bürgerschule on 25 February 1810 and then as a humanistic gymnasium on 21 August 1831. Kneiphof Gymnasium moved into a new structure north of the cathedral in 1865. Fridolin Ludwig Hermann von Drygalski, the father of explorer Erich von Drygalski, led the gymnasium from 1870 to 1900. The director founded a literary club ca. 1890; the club's participants included Carl Bulcke, Paul Wegener, Roderich Warkentin, and Adolf Petrenz. The school's last connection with the cathedral was the inclusion of the organist as part of singing lessons, but this ended in 1896. The gymnasium's expansion in 1898 included a new gym. Richard Armstedt was the school's director from 1900 to 1921. The sons of Königsberg's Jewish merchants often attended Kneiphof Gymnasium, while the sons of higher educated Jews, such as lawyers, doctors, and journalists, were more likely to attend Altstadt Gymnasium.

Kneiphof Gymnasium had approximately 200 students in 1586, approximately 300 students in 1650, 430 students in 1878, and 405 students in 1904. It was merged with Altstadt Gymnasium to form the combined Stadtgymnasium Altstadt-Kneiphof on 6 January 1923, with classes held in Kneiphof instead of Altstadt. The building was destroyed during the 1944 bombing of Königsberg in World War II.

== Notable people ==
=== Faculty ===
- Richard Armstedt (1851–1931), philologist
- Martin Chemnitz (1522–1586), theologian
- Leo Cholevius (1814–1878), philologist
- Simon Dach (1605–1659), poet
- Georg Lejeune-Dirichlet (1858–1920), pedagogue
- Georg Christoph Pisanski (1725–1790), theologian

=== Students ===
- Paul Adloff (1870–1944), dentist and anthropologist
- Robert Caspary (1818–1887), botanist
- Ludwig Clericus (1827–1892), heraldist
- Lovis Corinth (1858–1925), painter
- Georg Evert (1856–1914), statistician
- Gustav von Goßler (1838–1902), politician
- Robert Hagen (1815–1858), chemist
- Johann Gustav Hermes (1846–1912), mathematician
- Gustav Kirchhoff (1824–1887), physicist
- Karl von Lehndorff (1826–1883), diplomat
- Ernst Richard Neumann (1875–1955), mathematician
- Roderich Warkentin (1872–1902), professor
- Paul Wegener (1874–1948), actor
- Ernst Wichert (1831–1902), jurist
- August Wittich (1826–1897), archivist
- Arthur Zimmermann (1864–1940), diplomat
