= Stadtgymnasium Altstadt-Kneiphof =

School in Königsberg, Germany

Stadtgymnasium Altstadt-Kneiphof was a Gymnasium in the Kneiphof quarter of Königsberg, Germany.

== History ==
Despite some resistance, the school was established by merging Altstadt Gymnasium and Kneiphof Gymnasium on 6 January 1923, with classes held at the latter's location north of Königsberg Cathedral. Its first and only director was Dr. Arthur Mentz. Educational projects were first held at the chine Gausupschlucht near Rauschen in 1928, and it partnered with the Deutsche Gymnasium for Baltic Germans in Jelgava, Latvia, in 1929.

In 1933 the Stadtgymnasium celebrated the 600th anniversary of the founding of the schola parochialis ("the parish school") and the schola cathedralis (the "cathedral school"), the predecessors of the Altstadt and Kneiphof schools, respectively. The building was destroyed during the 1944 bombing of Königsberg in World War II. Classes continued to be taught by its instructors until the closing of all city schools on 23 January 1945. The Stadtgymnasium's traditions were sponsored in the postwar era by the Ratsgymnasium of Hanover.
