= Kaliningrad City Hall =

City hall of Kaliningrad, Russia

Coordinates: 54.7194°N 20.5004°E

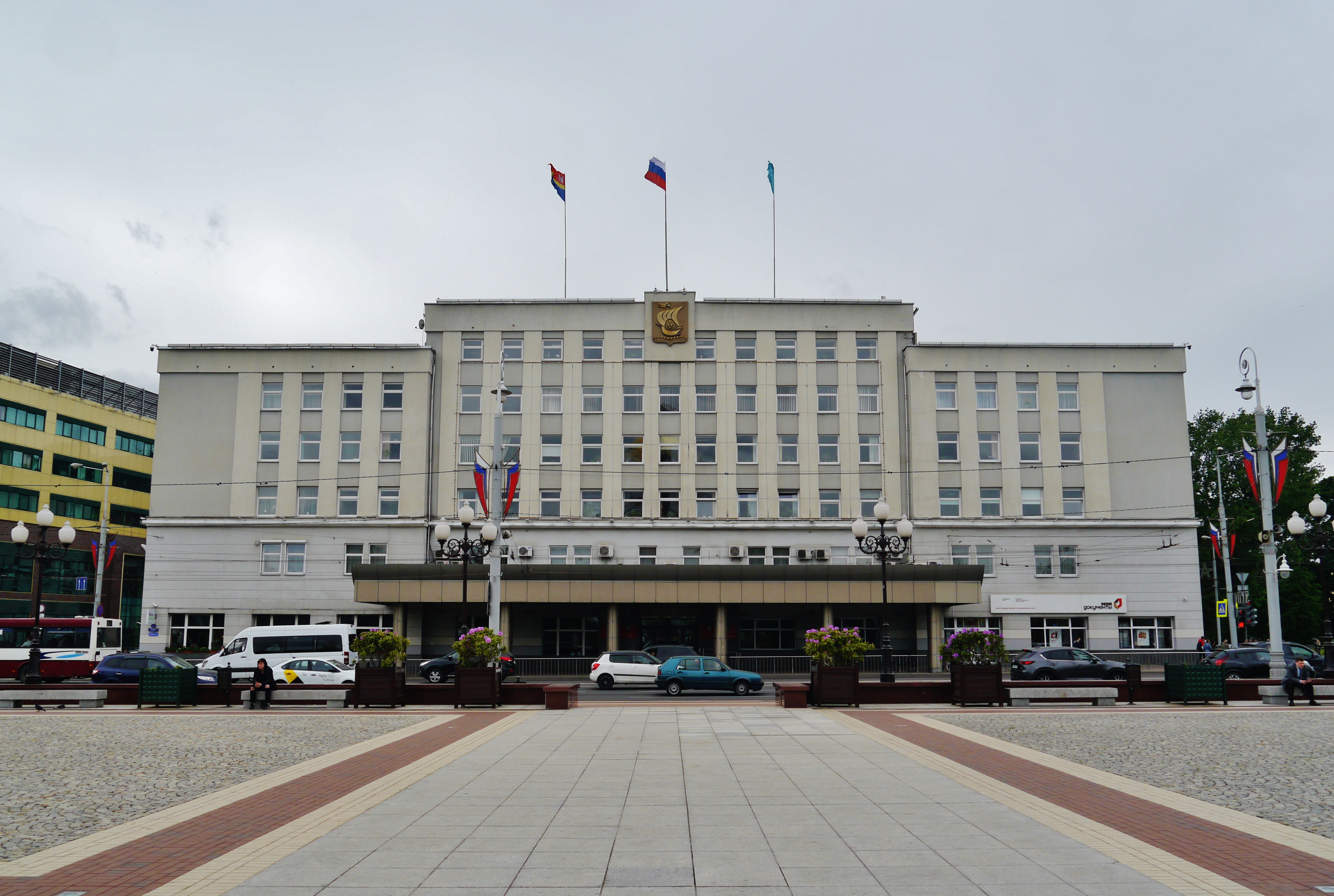
Kaliningrad City Hall

Kaliningrad City Hall is the seat of government in Kaliningrad, Russia. It is located at Victory Square.

The building was designed by architect Hanns Hopp in 1923, when the city was known as Königsberg, Germany. It was originally the Handelshof, a trade hall located at the square Hansaplatz (subsequently renamed Adolf-Hitler-Platz in 1934 and now Victory Square) and near the Ostmesse trade fair. By 1927, however, it became the Stadthaus, Königsberg's new city hall. Its predecessor, Kneiphof Town Hall, subsequently became a museum until its destruction during World War II. The Stadthaus was also damaged during World War II, but survived the war.

The building remained the municipal seat of government in post-war Kaliningrad, receiving a new facade.

== See also ==
- Altstadt Town Hall
- Kneiphof Town Hall
- Löbenicht Town Hall
