= Kneiphof =

Prussian town

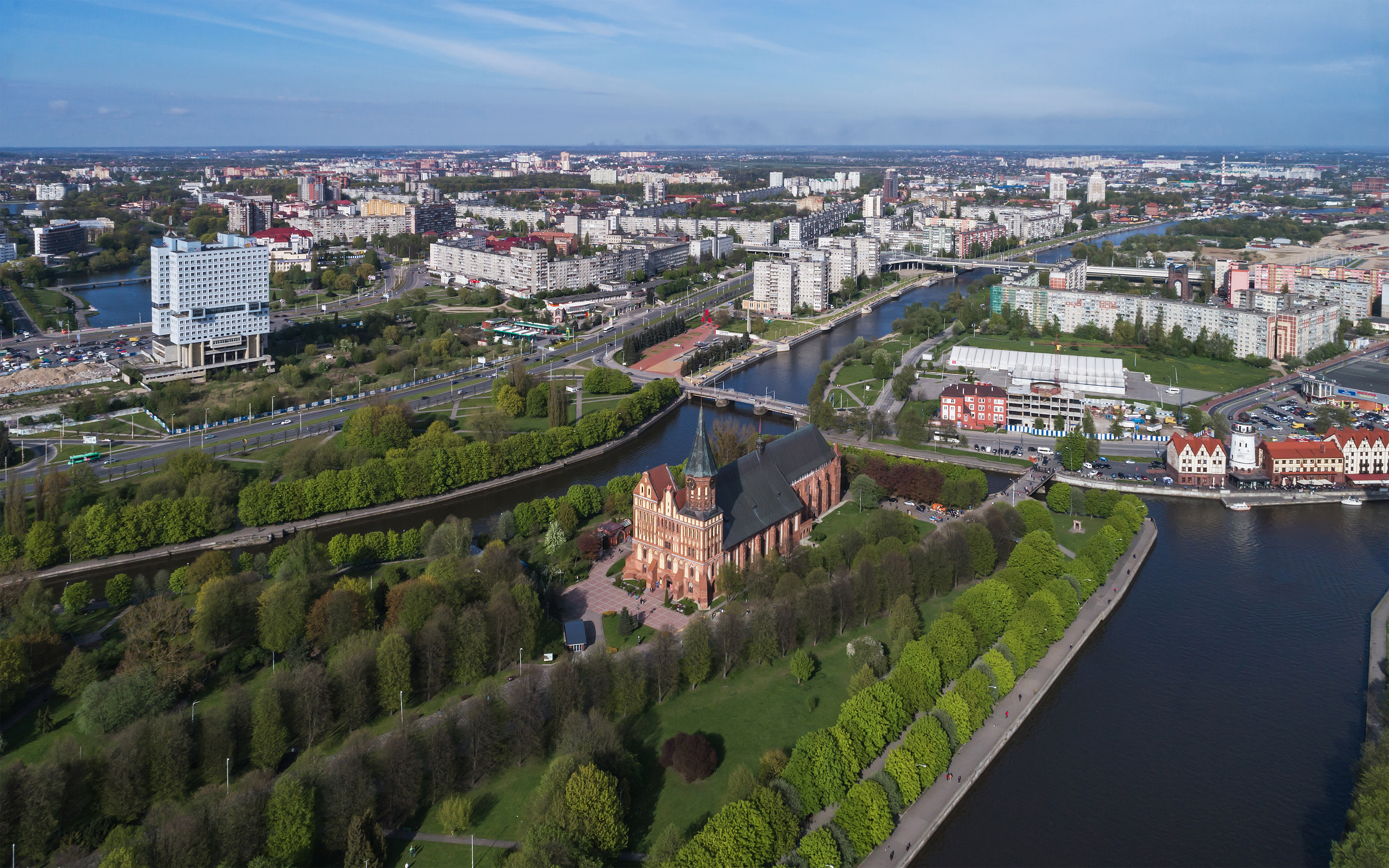
Aerial view of today's Kaliningrad downtown with Kneiphof in the foreground

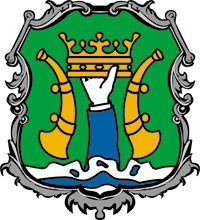
Coat of arms of Kneiphof

Kneiphof (Russian: Кнайпхоф; Polish: Knipawa; Lithuanian: Knypava) was a quarter of central Königsberg (Kaliningrad). During the Middle Ages it was one of the three towns that composed the city of Königsberg, the others being Altstadt and Löbenicht. The town was located on a 10-hectare (25-acre) island of the same name in the Pregel River and included Königsberg Cathedral and the original campus of the University of Königsberg. Its territory is now part of the Moskovsky District of Kaliningrad, Russia.

== Etymology ==
Medieval variations of Kneiphof included Knipaw, Knipab, and Knypabe. The name was of Old Prussian origin, referring to a swampy land or area flushed by water; the island was bounded to the north by the Neue Pregel and to the south by the Alte Pregel (or Natangische Pregel), branches of the Pregel River. At the start of the 14th century the island was known in German as Vogtswerder (Vogt's ait), because it was used by a vogt of the Teutonic Knights. The name Pregelmünde (mouth of the Pregel) was encouraged in 1333, but the German townspeople instead used the Prussian name used in the 1327 charter. A town seal from 1383 and a 15th-century signet name the town as nova civitas, or new town, but this designation was not used in documents.

== History ==
=== Foundation ===
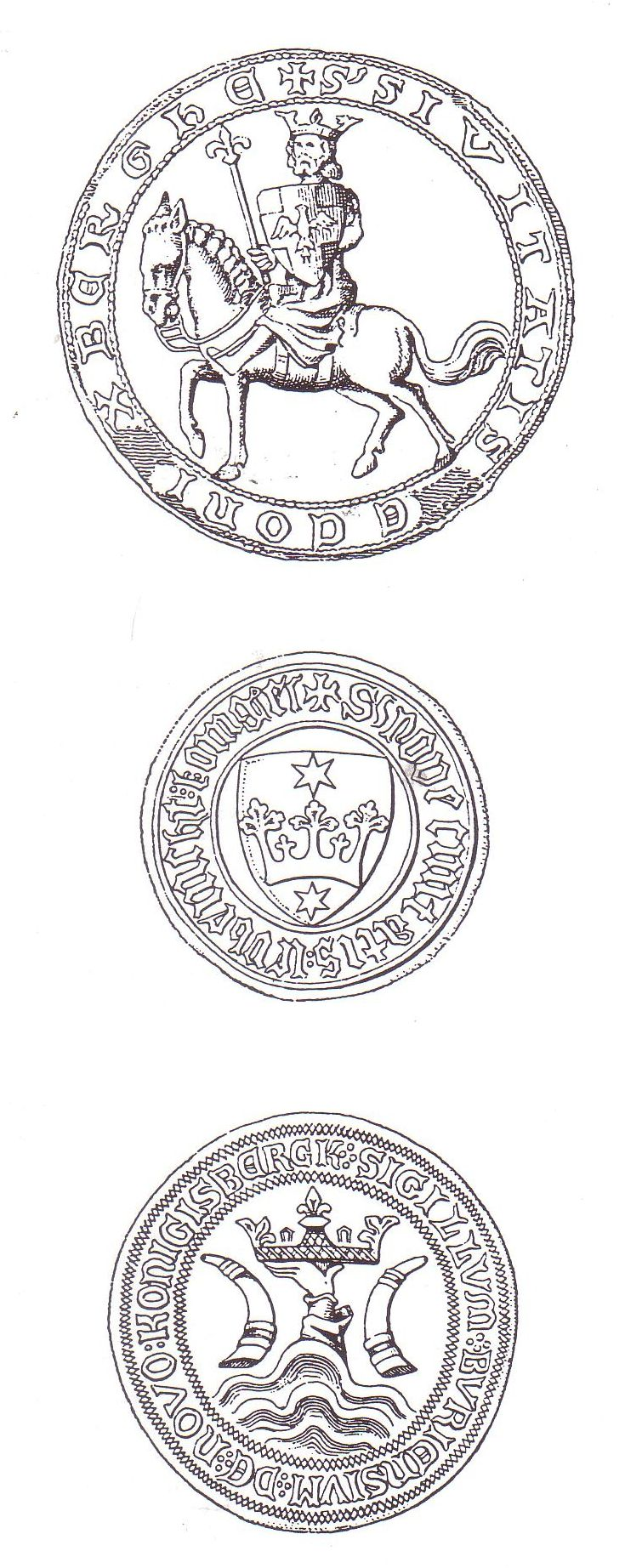
Oldest remaining seals of (from top) Altstadt (1360), Löbenicht (1413), and Kneiphof (1383)

Founded within the state of the Teutonic Order, Kneiphof was the youngest of Königsberg's three towns, each of which had its own charter, market rights, church, and fortifications. Settlement by merchants was intensified in 1324 with construction along the Langgasse and the bridges Krämerbrücke and Grüne Brücke. It was granted Kulm rights on 6 April 1327 by Grand Master Werner von Orseln. The new town of Kneiphof encompassed two-thirds of the island; in the same year Orseln granted the eastern third of the island to the Bishopric of Samland to allow construction of Königsberg Cathedral, which occurred from ca. 1330–80. Kneiphof's coat of arms depicted a blue-clad arm extending from waves and holding a crown, flanked by two golden hunting horns in a green field. The charter of 1327 permitted the settlement of Poles.

Along with the island, the town of Kneiphof also had jurisdiction over the Freiheiten Vorstadt and village Haberberg in Natangia. Haberberg and Alter Garten were granted to Kneiphof by Grand Master Albert for services rendered during the Horsemen's War. Kneiphof's warehouses were built in Vordere Vorstadt. Other places controlled by Kneiphof included the village Schönfliess, the estates Fischhof and Anker along the Pregel, Rosenau, and the tile factory in Genslack near Ottenhagen.

Bridges connecting Kneiphof to Altstadt were the Krämerbrücke (built 1286), the Dombrücke (built ca. 1330, destroyed 1379), and the Schmiedebrücke (built 1379). The Honigbrücke (built 1542) connected Kneiphof to Lomse, while the town was connected with Vorstadt by the Grüne Brücke (built 1322) and the Köttelbrücke (built 1377). These are five of the bridges in the seven bridges of Königsberg mathematics problem. Euler's proof that no solution is possible provides the foundations for graph theory and the application of topological understanding to exploring real-world questions.

As a member of the Hanseatic League, Kneiphof took part in the Confederation of Cologne against King Valdemar IV of Denmark in 1367.

=== Thirteen Years' War ===
In February 1440, representatives of both Altstadt and Kneiphof took part in a convention in Elbląg, at which a decision was made to establish the Prussian Confederation. Both were founding members of the Confederation in March 1440, while Löbenicht was not. In 1454, the Confederation asked Polish King Casimir IV Jagiellon to incorporate the region into the Kingdom of Poland, to which the King agreed and signed the act of incorporation in Kraków, and the towns rebelled against the Teutonic Knights at the beginning of the subsequent Thirteen Years' War and recognized the Polish King as rightful ruler. The rebellion in Königsberg was supported by the merchant class and led by Altstadt's mayor, Andreas Brunau. Based upon the example of Danzig (Gdańsk), Brunau hoped to turn Königsberg into an autonomous city within Poland with control over all Samland. On 19 June Kneiphof's mayor, Jürgen Langerbein, paid fealty to the Polish chancellor, Jan Taszka Koniecpolski, confirming the city's accession to Poland.

Brunau lost the support of Altstadt and Löbenicht on 24 March 1455 due to spontaneous opposition from craftsmen and workers, with the rebels retreating to Kneiphof. The workers in Kneiphof were too weak to defeat Brunau's rebels. Komtur Heinrich Reuß von Plauen, supported by Old Prussian freemen bringing 300 horses, approached the city on 15 April, with Altstadt and Löbenicht paying homage in the following days. Kneiphof remained in rebellion, however, protected by water and walls. Langerbein's forces consisted of 1,000 men, including 400 from Danzig. Plauen had the support of Altstadt, Löbenicht, 300 Sambian freemen, and soldiers led by Silesian and Saxon nobility, including Balthasar of Żagań, Hans and Adolf von Gleichen, Johann von Wartenburg, and Botho von Eulenburg.

Plauen led an unsuccessful attack on Kneiphof from Haberberg on 13 April, followed by indecisive fighting between Kneiphof and Altstadt from 18 to 19 April. After nine ships from Polish-allied Danzig arrived to aid Kneiphof, Plauen's forces took two bridges and protected them with blockhouses to prevent further reinforcements. When another fifteen ships arrived the Danzigers were able to recapture one bridge, but took heavy losses trying for the second and retreated after four days of fighting. Plauen resisted sorties from Kneiphof and his forces steadily grew in number; the Landmeister of Livonia provided 500 troops and King Christian I of Denmark sent a ship. The rebels in Kneiphof surrendered out of hunger to Plauen on 14 July, with soldiers and citizenry receiving amnesty. Kneiphof remained distrustful of Plauen and the Teutonic Knights, but resented the lack of Polish assistance. The amnesty was not upheld, as after the attack of Polish-allied forces from Danzig on the Vistula Spit in November 1455, the Teutonic Knights accused Kneiphof of inciting the enemy and removed its council and burghers. The mayor fled to Stralsund, and his family lost their property. In 1455 Plauen reaffirmed Kneiphof's town rights. The war ended in 1466 with a peace treaty, according to which the town became a part of Poland as a fief held by the Teutonic Knights.

=== Modern era ===
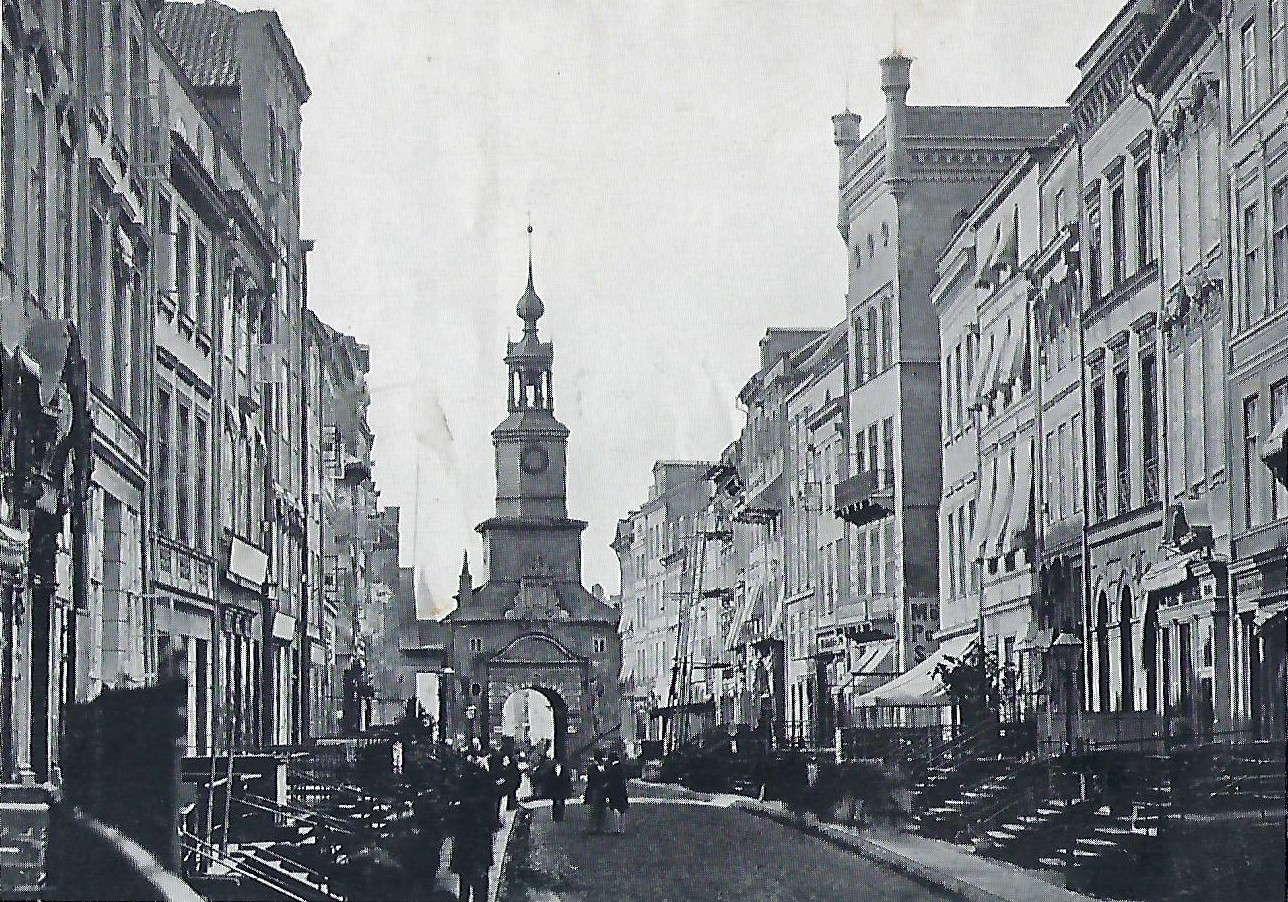
Kneiphöfische Langgasse in c. 1864

Kneiphof became part of the Duchy of Prussia when the Teutonic Order's Prussian branch was secularized in 1525, and remained a fief of Poland. The University of Königsberg, the Albertina, was founded just east of the cathedral in 1544, and then granted the royal privilege by Polish King Sigismund II Augustus in 1560. A new campus, the Neue Universität at the Paradeplatz north of Altstadt, was dedicated in 1861 as its replacement. Polish church services were held in the Cathedral from 1618 to 1817.

Kneiphof became part of the Kingdom of Prussia in 1701. In the same year the three towns resisted the efforts of Burgfreiheit to form a proposed fourth town, Friedrichsstadt. By the Rathäusliche Reglement of 13 June 1724, King Frederick William I of Prussia merged Altstadt, Löbenicht, Kneiphof, and their respective suburbs into the united city of Königsberg. Königsberg Castle and its suburbs remained separate until the Städteordnung of Stein on 19 November 1808 during the era of Prussian reforms.

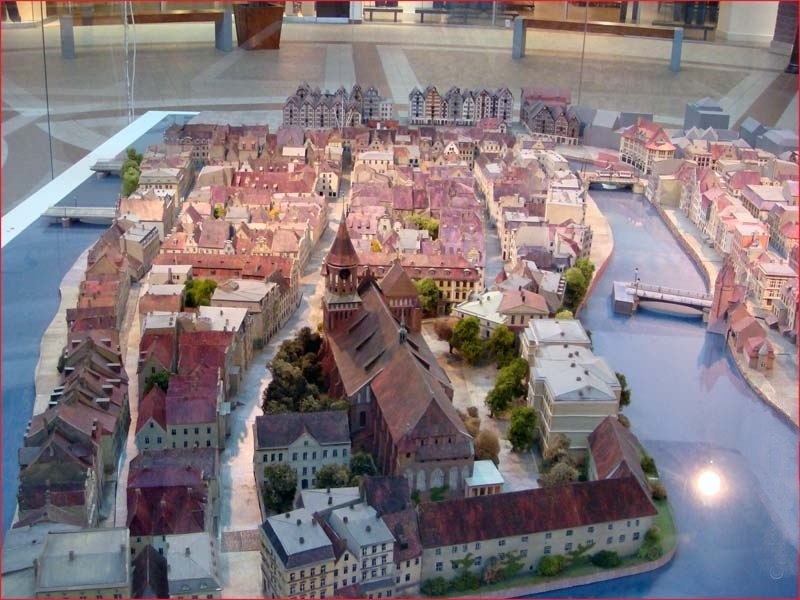
Reconstruction of Kneiphof in Kaliningrad's museum

=== Kaliningrad ===
Kneiphof was devastated by the 1944 bombing of Königsberg in World War II. Conquered by the Soviet Union in 1945, Königsberg was renamed to Kaliningrad in 1946. Material from former Kneiphof's buildings was used for the reconstruction of cities such as Leningrad. In the 1970s the island began to be converted into a park with numerous sculptures. Reconstruction of the cathedral commenced in the 1990s. Former Kneiphof is now known as Kant Island (Russian: остров Иммануила Канта), in honor of the philosopher Immanuel Kant.

== Locations ==
Königsberg Cathedral rose high above the island town. Kneiphof Town Hall served as city hall for all of Königsberg from 1724 until 1927, when the administration moved to the Stadthaus. The island's secondary school, Kneiphof Gymnasium, was located north of the cathedral and later hosted the combined Stadtgymnasium Altstadt-Kneiphof. Königsberg's municipal library and archive were located in the original campus of the university.

Kneiphöfische Langgasse was one of the busiest thoroughfares in the city. Banks with locations along the street in the 20th century included Dresdner Bank, Commerzbank, Landesbank der Provinz Ostpreußen, Stadtsparkasse, and Ostbank für Handel und Gewerbe.

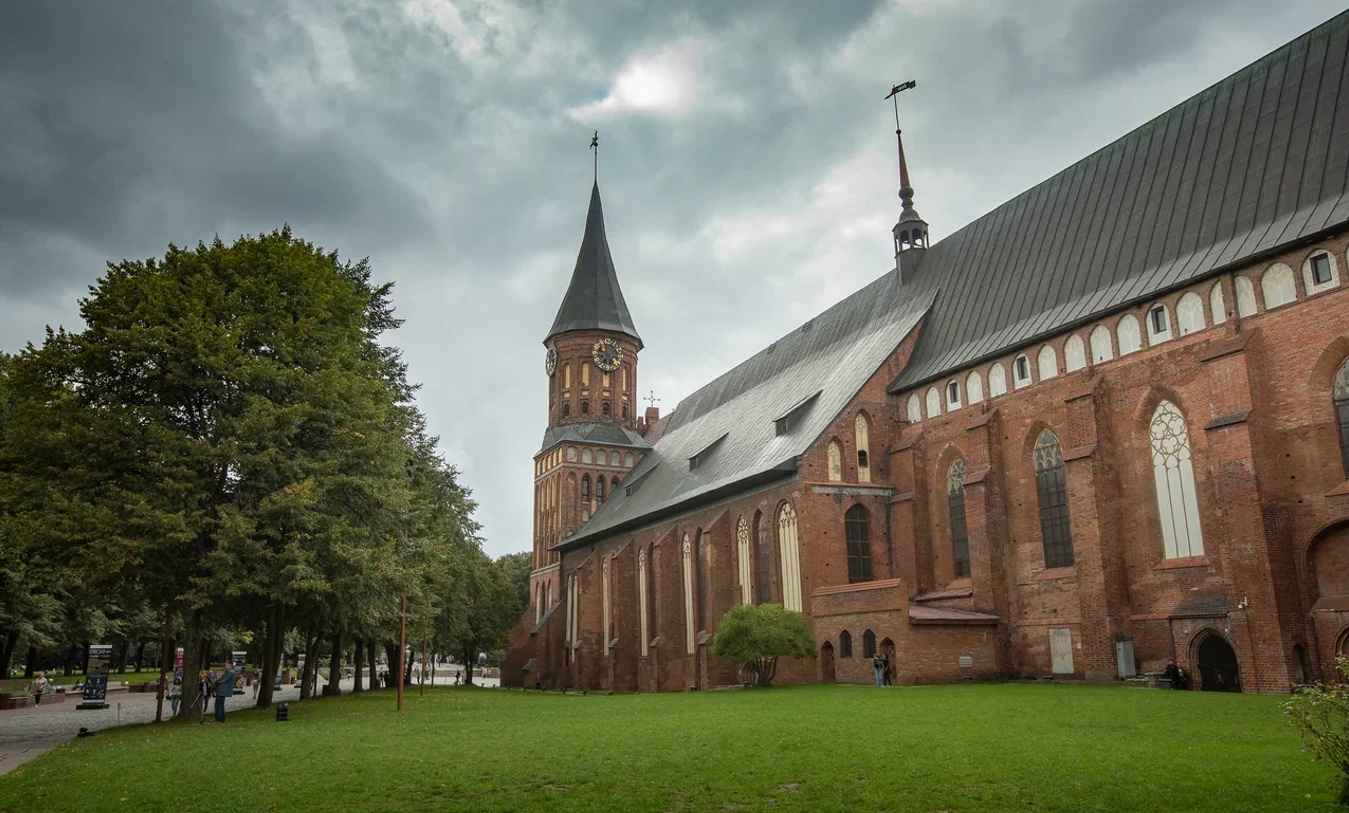
Cathedral

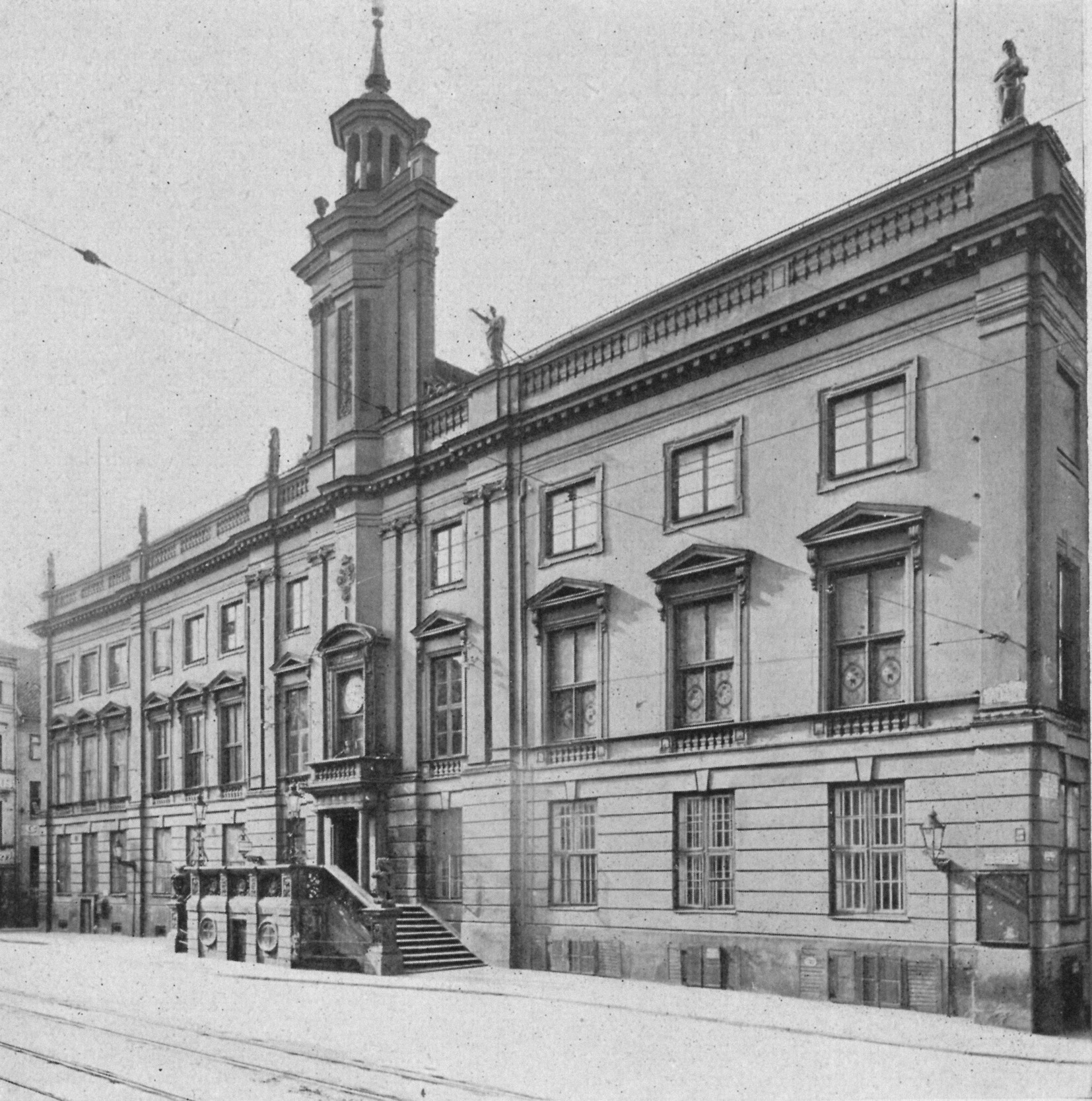
Town Hall

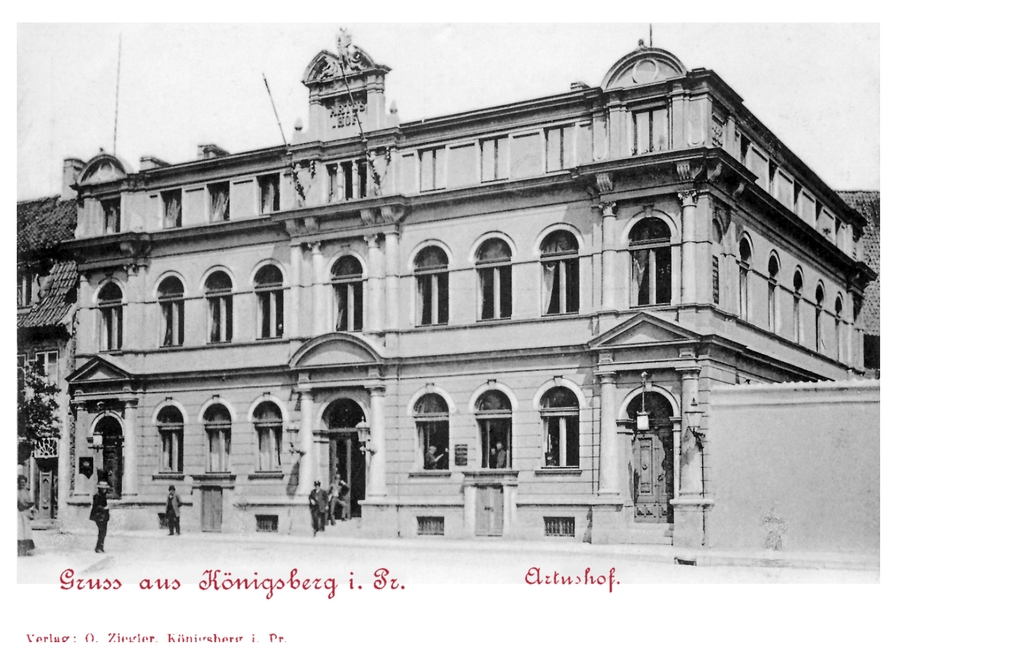
Artus Court

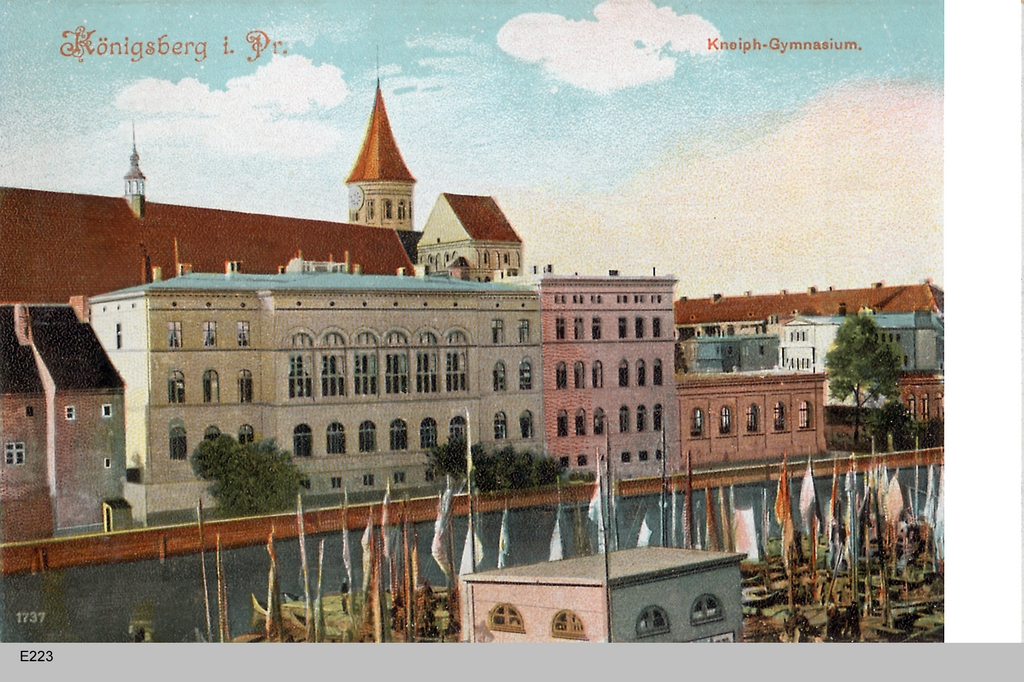
Gymnasium
